= List of birds of Malawi =

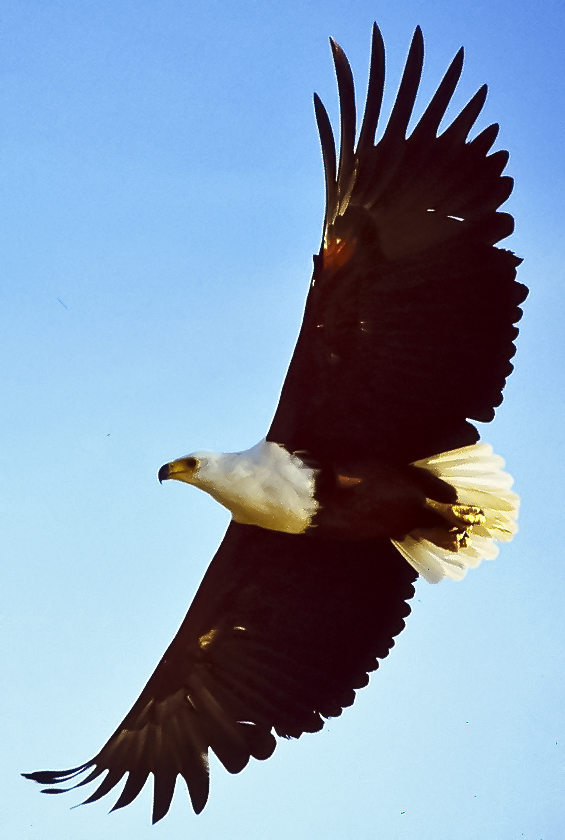
African fish-eagle, common around lakes and rivers

This is a list of the bird species recorded in Malawi. The avifauna of Malawi include a total of 683 species, of which 2 have been introduced by humans. 1 species is endemic.

This list's taxonomic treatment (designation and sequence of orders, families and species) and nomenclature (common and scientific names) follow the conventions of The Clements Checklist of Birds of the World, 2022 edition. The family accounts at the beginning of each heading reflect this taxonomy, as do the species counts found in each family account. Introduced and accidental species are included in the total counts for Malawi.

The following tags have been used to highlight several categories, but not all species fall into one of these categories. Those that do not are commonly occurring native species.

- (A) Accidental - a rarely occurring species in Malawi
- (E) Endemic - a species endemic to Malawi
- (I) Introduced - a species introduced to Malawi as a consequence, direct or indirect, of human actions
- (Ex) Extirpated - a species that no longer occurs in Malawi although populations exist elsewhere

== Ducks, geese, and waterfowl ==
Order: Anseriformes Family: Anatidae

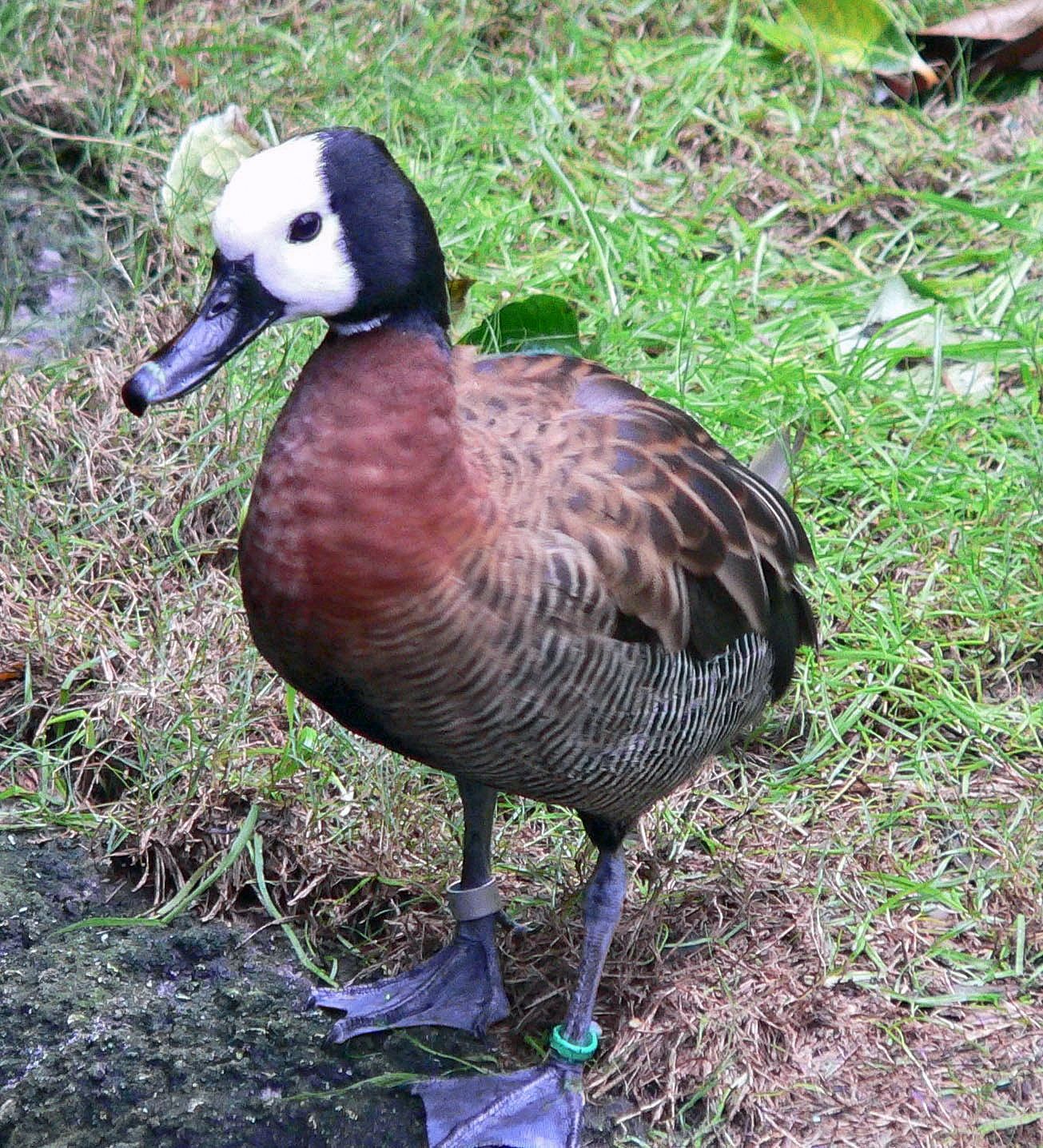
White-faced whistling-duck, the most widespread of Malawi's ducks

Anatidae includes the ducks and most duck-like waterfowl, such as geese and swans. These birds are adapted to an aquatic existence with webbed feet, flattened bills, and feathers that are excellent at shedding water due to an oily coating.

- White-faced whistling-duck, Dendrocygna viduata
- Fulvous whistling-duck, Dendrocygna bicolor
- White-backed duck, Thalassornis leuconotus
- Knob-billed duck, Sarkidiornis melanotos
- Egyptian goose, Alopochen aegyptiacus
- Spur-winged goose, Plectropterus gambensis
- African pygmy-goose, Nettapus auritus
- Garganey, Spatula querquedula
- Blue-billed teal, Spatula hottentota
- Northern shoveler, Spatula clypeata (A)
- African black duck, Anas sparsa
- Yellow-billed duck, Anas undulata
- Cape teal, Anas capensis (A)
- Red-billed duck, Anas erythrorhyncha
- Northern pintail, Anas acuta (A)
- Southern pochard, Netta erythrophthalma
- Tufted duck, Aythya fuligula (A)
- Maccoa duck, Oxyura maccoa (A)

== Guineafowl ==
Order: Galliformes Family: Numididae

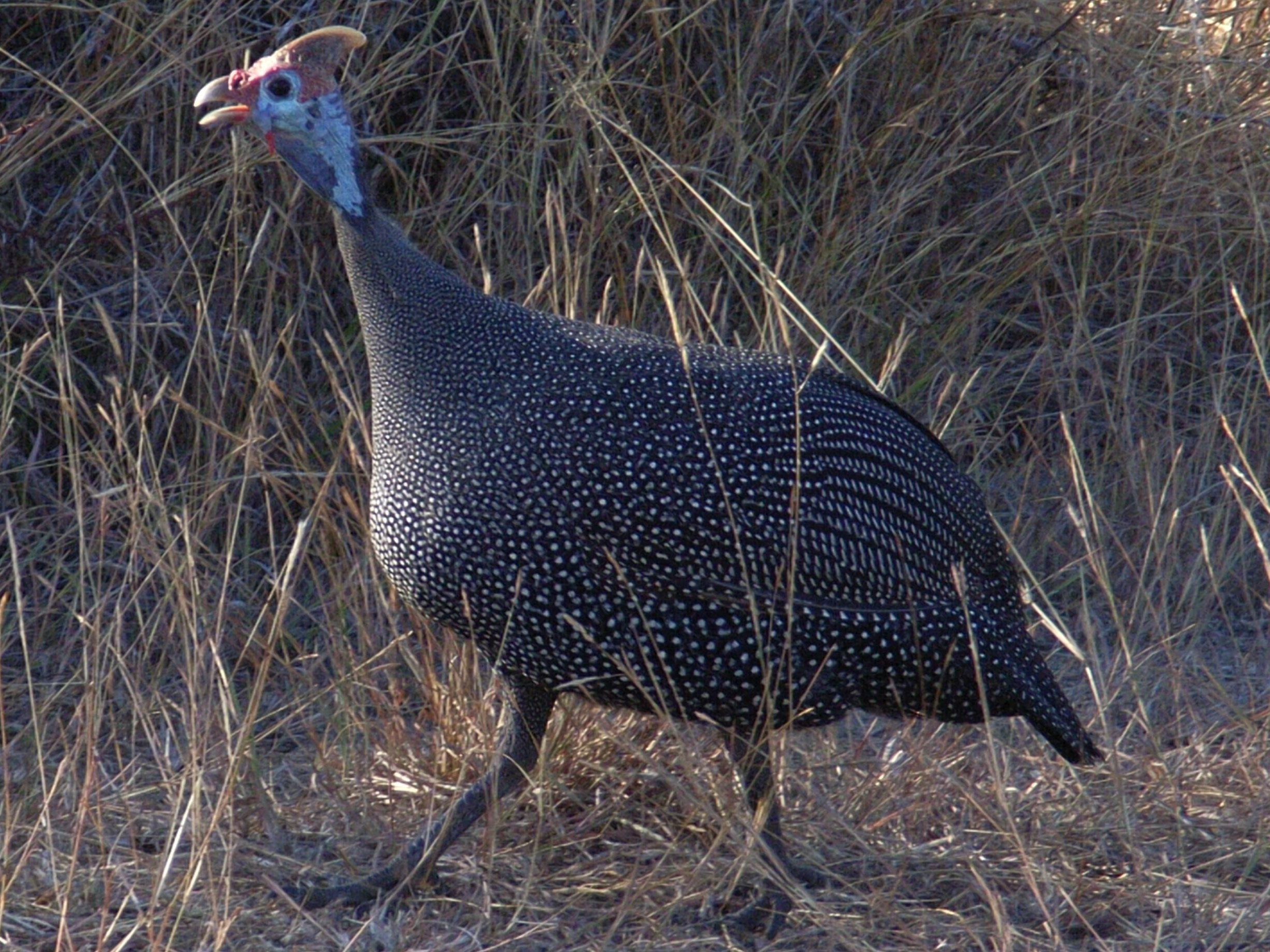
Helmeted guineafowl, domesticated in many areas

Guineafowl are a group of African, seed-eating, ground-nesting birds that resemble partridges, but with featherless heads and spangled grey plumage.

- Helmeted guineafowl, Numida meleagris
- Southern crested guineafowl, Guttera edouardi

== Pheasants, grouse, and allies ==
Order: Galliformes Family: Phasianidae

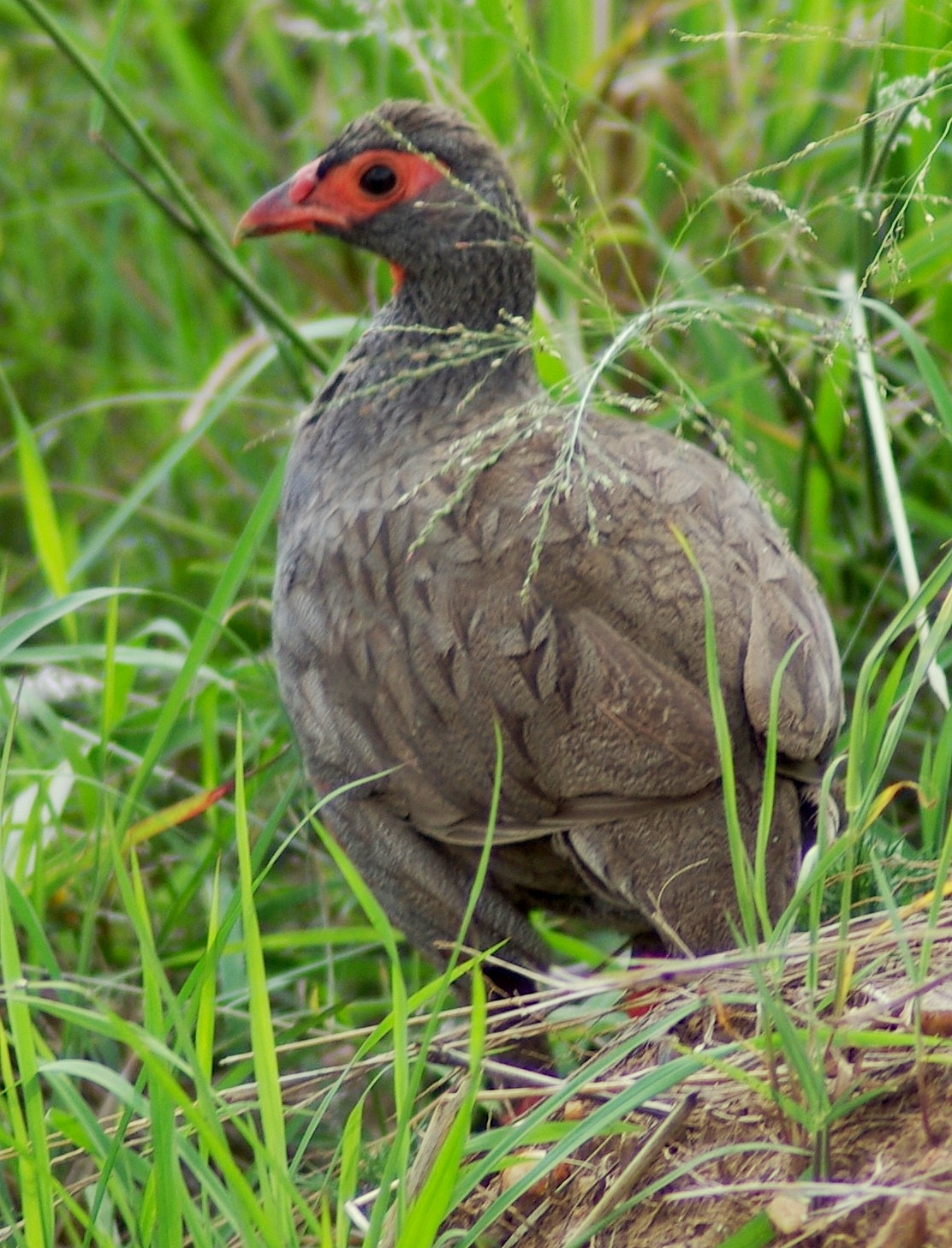
Red-necked spurfowl, the most common francolin in Malawi

The Phasianidae are a family of terrestrial birds which consists of quails, partridges, snowcocks, francolins, spurfowls, tragopans, monals, pheasants, peafowls and jungle fowls. In general, they are plump (although they vary in size) and have broad, relatively short wings.

- Crested francolin, Ortygornis sephaena
- Coqui francolin, Campocolinus coqui
- Red-winged francolin, Scleroptila levaillantii
- Shelley's francolin, Scleroptila shelleyi
- Whyte's francolin, Scleroptila whytei
- Blue quail, Synoicus adansonii
- Common quail, Coturnix coturnix
- Harlequin quail, Coturnix delegorguei
- Hildebrandt's francolin, Pternistis hildebrandti
- Scaly francolin, Pternistis squamatus
- Swainson's francolin, Pternistis swainsonii
- Red-necked spurfowl, Pternistis afer

== Flamingos ==
Order: Phoenicopteriformes Family: Phoenicopteridae

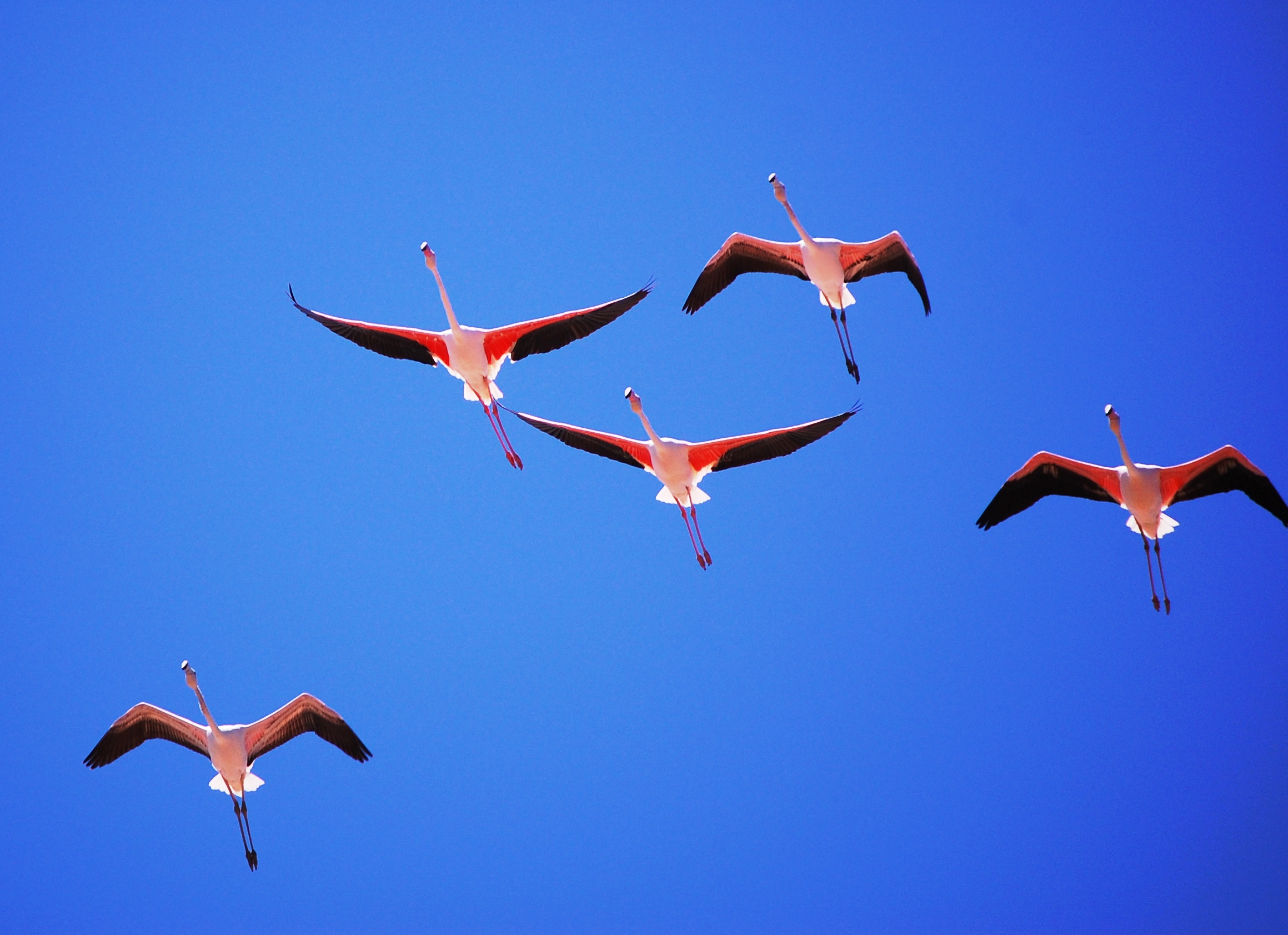
Greater flamingo, a regular migrant to Lake Chilwa and other wetlands

Flamingos are gregarious wading birds, usually 3 to 5 feet (0.9 to 1.5 m) tall, found in both the Western and Eastern Hemispheres. Flamingos filter-feed on shellfish and algae. Their oddly shaped beaks are specially adapted to separate mud and silt from the food they consume and, uniquely, are used upside-down.

- Greater flamingo, Phoenicopterus roseus
- Lesser flamingo, Phoenicopterus minor

== Grebes ==
Order: Podicipediformes Family: Podicipedidae

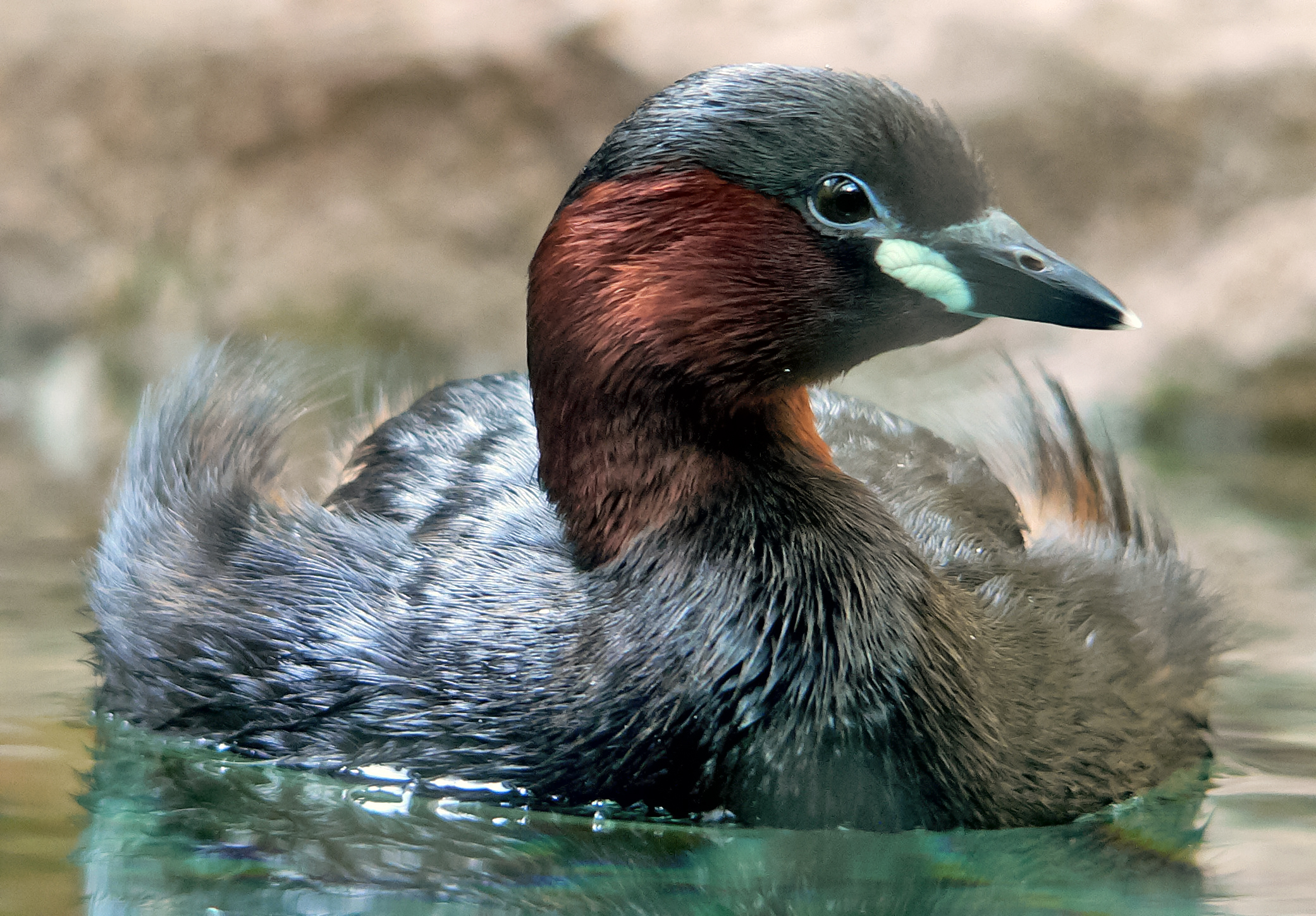
Little grebe, widespread on small bodies of water

Grebes are small to medium-large freshwater diving birds. They have lobed toes and are excellent swimmers and divers. However, they have their feet placed far back on the body, making them quite ungainly on land.

- Little grebe, Tachybaptus ruficollis

== Pigeons and doves ==
Order: Columbiformes Family: Columbidae

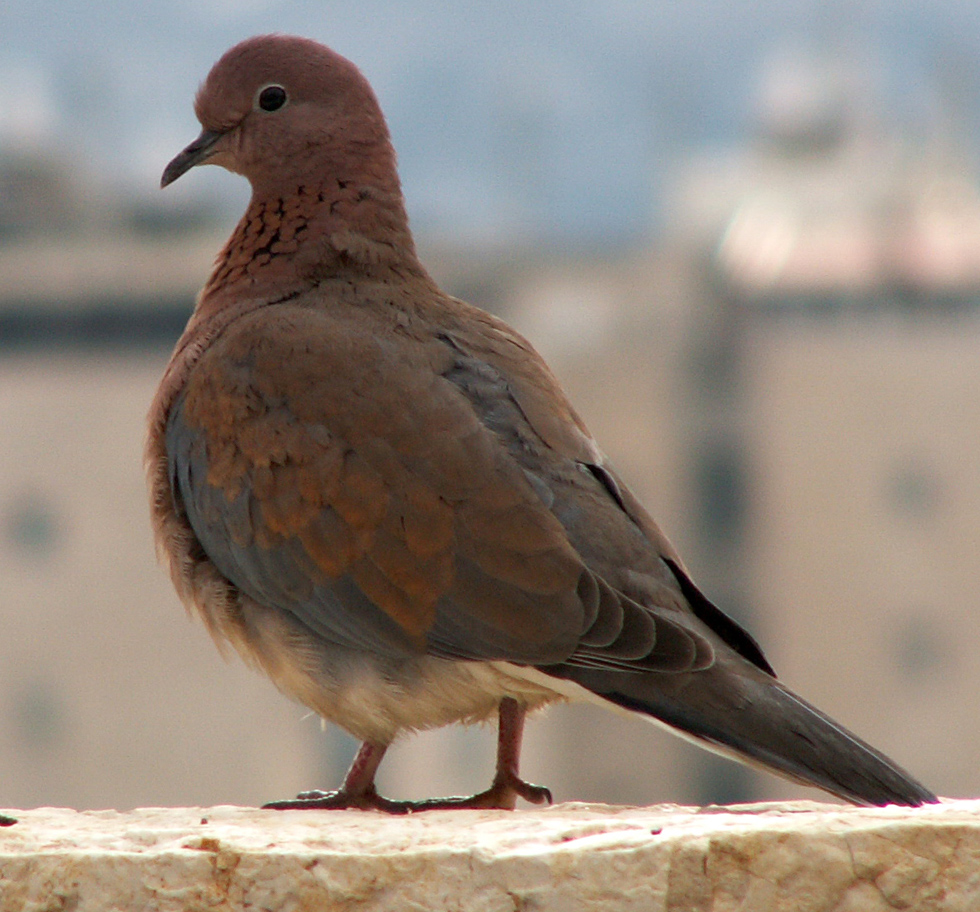
Laughing dove, widespread in drier regions and increasing in number

Pigeons and doves are stout-bodied birds with short necks and short slender bills with a fleshy cere.

- Rock pigeon, Columba livia (I)
- Speckled pigeon, Columba guinea
- Rameron pigeon, Columba arquatrix
- Delegorgue's pigeon, Columba delegorguei
- Lemon dove, Columba larvata
- Dusky turtle-dove, Streptopelia lugens
- Mourning collared-dove, Streptopelia decipiens
- Red-eyed dove, Streptopelia semitorquata
- Ring-necked dove, Streptopelia capicola
- Laughing dove, Streptopelia senegalensis
- Emerald-spotted wood-dove, Turtur chalcospilos
- Blue-spotted wood-dove, Turtur afer
- Tambourine dove, Turtur tympanistria
- Namaqua dove, Oena capensis
- African green-pigeon, Treron calva

== Sandgrouse ==
Order: Pterocliformes Family: Pteroclidae

Sandgrouse have small, pigeon like heads and necks, but sturdy compact bodies. They have long pointed wings and sometimes tails and a fast direct flight. Flocks fly to watering holes at dawn and dusk. Their legs are feathered down to the toes.

- Double-banded sandgrouse, Pterocles bicinctus

== Bustards ==
Order: Otidiformes Family: Otididae

Bustards are large terrestrial birds mainly associated with dry open country and steppes in the Old World. They are omnivorous and nest on the ground. They walk steadily on strong legs and big toes, pecking for food as they go. They have long broad wings with "fingered" wingtips and striking patterns in flight. Many have interesting mating displays.

- Denham's bustard, Neotis denhami
- Black-bellied bustard, Lissotis melanogaster

== Turacos ==
Order: Cuculiformes Family: Musophagidae

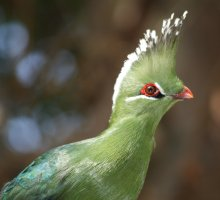
Livingstone's turaco, common in forest and woodland in the south-east

The turacos, plantain eaters and go-away-birds make up the bird family Musophagidae. They are medium-sized arboreal birds. The turacos and plantain eaters are brightly coloured, usually in blue, green or purple. The go-away birds are mostly grey and white.

- Livingstone's turaco, Tauraco livingstonii
- Schalow's turaco, Tauraco schalowi
- Purple-crested turaco, Tauraco porphyreolophus
- Bare-faced go-away-bird, Corythaixoides personatus
- Gray go-away-bird, Corythaixoides concolor

== Cuckoos ==
Order: Cuculiformes Family: Cuculidae

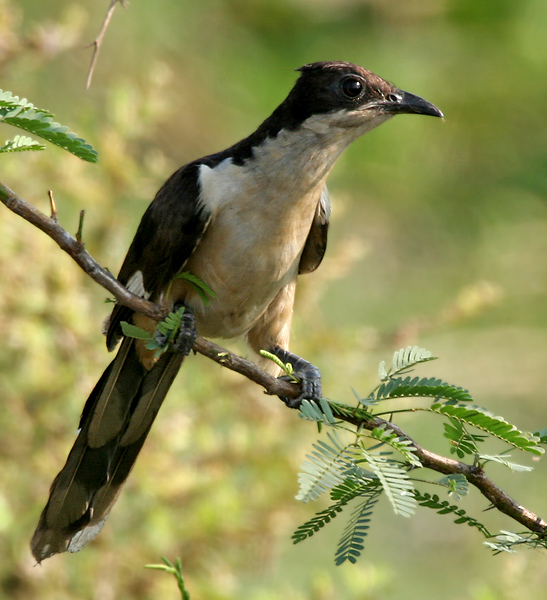
Pied cuckoo, a migrant from other parts of Africa and perhaps also from Asia

The family Cuculidae includes cuckoos, roadrunners and anis. These birds are of variable size with slender bodies, long tails and strong legs. The Old World cuckoos are brood parasites.

- Senegal coucal, Centropus senegalensis
- Coppery-tailed coucal, Centropus cupreicaudus
- White-browed coucal, Centropus superciliosus
- Black coucal, Centropus grillii
- Green malkoha, Ceuthmochares australis
- Great spotted cuckoo, Clamator glandarius
- Levaillant's cuckoo, Clamator levaillantii
- Pied cuckoo, Clamator jacobinus
- Thick-billed cuckoo, Pachycoccyx audeberti
- Dideric cuckoo, Chrysococcyx caprius
- Klaas's cuckoo, Chrysococcyx klaas
- African emerald cuckoo, Chrysococcyx cupreus
- Barred long-tailed cuckoo, Cercococcyx montanus
- Black cuckoo, Cuculus clamosus
- Red-chested cuckoo, Cuculus solitarius
- Lesser cuckoo, Cuculus poliocephalus
- African cuckoo, Cuculus gularis
- Madagascar cuckoo, Cuculus rochii (A)
- Common cuckoo, Cuculus canorus

== Nightjars and allies ==
Order: Caprimulgiformes Family: Caprimulgidae

Nightjars are medium-sized nocturnal birds that usually nest on the ground. They have long wings, short legs and very short bills. Most have small feet, of little use for walking, and long pointed wings. Their soft plumage is camouflaged to resemble bark or leaves.

- Pennant-winged nightjar, Caprimulgus vexillarius
- Eurasian nightjar, Caprimulgus europaeus
- Fiery-necked nightjar, Caprimulgus pectoralis
- Montane nightjar, Caprimulgus poliocephalus
- Freckled nightjar, Caprimulgus tristigma
- Square-tailed nightjar, Caprimulgus fossii

== Swifts ==
Order: Caprimulgiformes Family: Apodidae

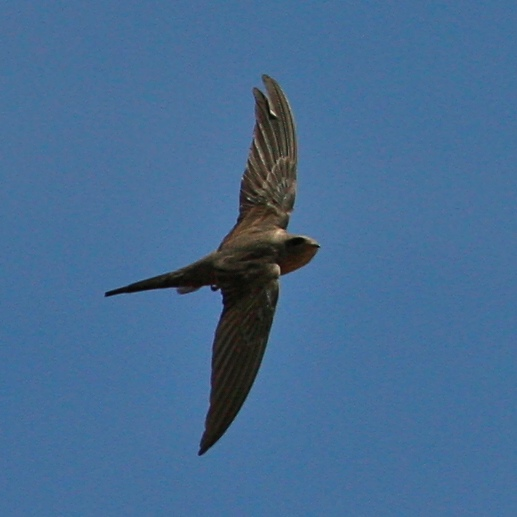
African palm-swift, common around palms in lowland areas

Swifts are small birds which spend the majority of their lives flying. These birds have very short legs and never settle voluntarily on the ground, perching instead only on vertical surfaces. Many swifts have long swept-back wings which resemble a crescent or boomerang.

- Mottled spinetail, Telacanthura ussheri (A)
- Bat-like spinetail, Neafrapus boehmi (A)
- Scarce swift, Schoutedenapus myoptilus
- Alpine swift, Apus melba
- Mottled swift, Apus aequatorialis
- Common swift, Apus apus
- African swift, Apus barbatus
- Little swift, Apus affinis
- Horus swift, Apus horus
- White-rumped swift, Apus caffer
- African palm-swift, Cypsiurus parvus

== Flufftails ==
Order: Gruiformes Family: Sarothruridae

The flufftails are a small family of ground-dwelling birds found only in Madagascar and sub-Saharan Africa.

- Buff-spotted flufftail, Sarothrura elegans
- Red-chested flufftail, Sarothrura rufa
- Chestnut-headed flufftail, Sarothrura lugens (A)
- Streaky-breasted flufftail, Sarothrura boehmi
- Striped flufftail, Sarothrura affinis

== Rails, gallinules and coots ==
Order: Gruiformes Family: Rallidae

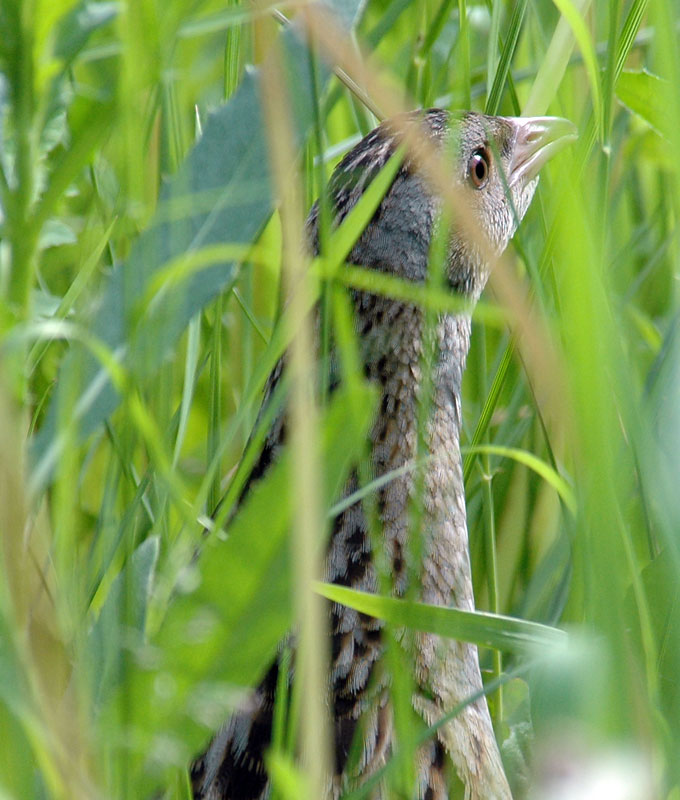
Corn crake, a declining migrant from Eurasia

Rallidae is a large family of small to medium-sized birds which includes the rails, crakes, coots and gallinules. Typically they inhabit dense vegetation in damp environments near lakes, swamps or rivers. In general they are shy and secretive birds, making them difficult to observe. Most species have strong legs and long toes which are well adapted to soft uneven surfaces. They tend to have short, rounded wings and to be weak fliers.

- African rail, Rallus caerulescens
- Corn crake, Crex crex
- African crake, Crex egregia
- Spotted crake, Porzana porzana
- Lesser moorhen, Gallinula angulata
- Eurasian moorhen, Gallinula chloropus
- Red-knobbed coot, Fulica cristata
- Allen's gallinule, Porphyrio alleni
- African swamphen, Porphyrio madagascariensis
- Striped crake, Amaurornis marginalis
- Black crake, Zapornia flavirostra
- Baillon's crake, Zapornia pusilla

== Finfoots ==
Order: Gruiformes Family: Heliornithidae

Heliornithidae is a small family of tropical birds with webbed lobes on their feet similar to those of grebes and coots.

- African finfoot, Podica senegalensis

== Cranes ==
Order: Gruiformes Family: Gruidae

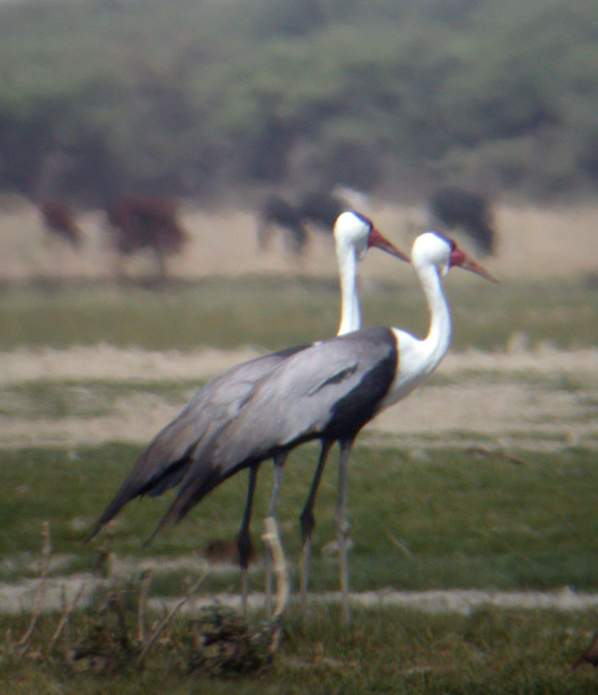
Wattled crane, now very rare

Cranes are large, long-legged and long-necked birds. Unlike the similar-looking but unrelated herons, cranes fly with necks outstretched, not pulled back. Most have elaborate and noisy courting displays or "dances".

- Gray crowned-crane, Balearica regulorum
- Wattled crane, Bugeranus carunculatus

== Thick-knees ==
Order: Charadriiformes Family: Burhinidae

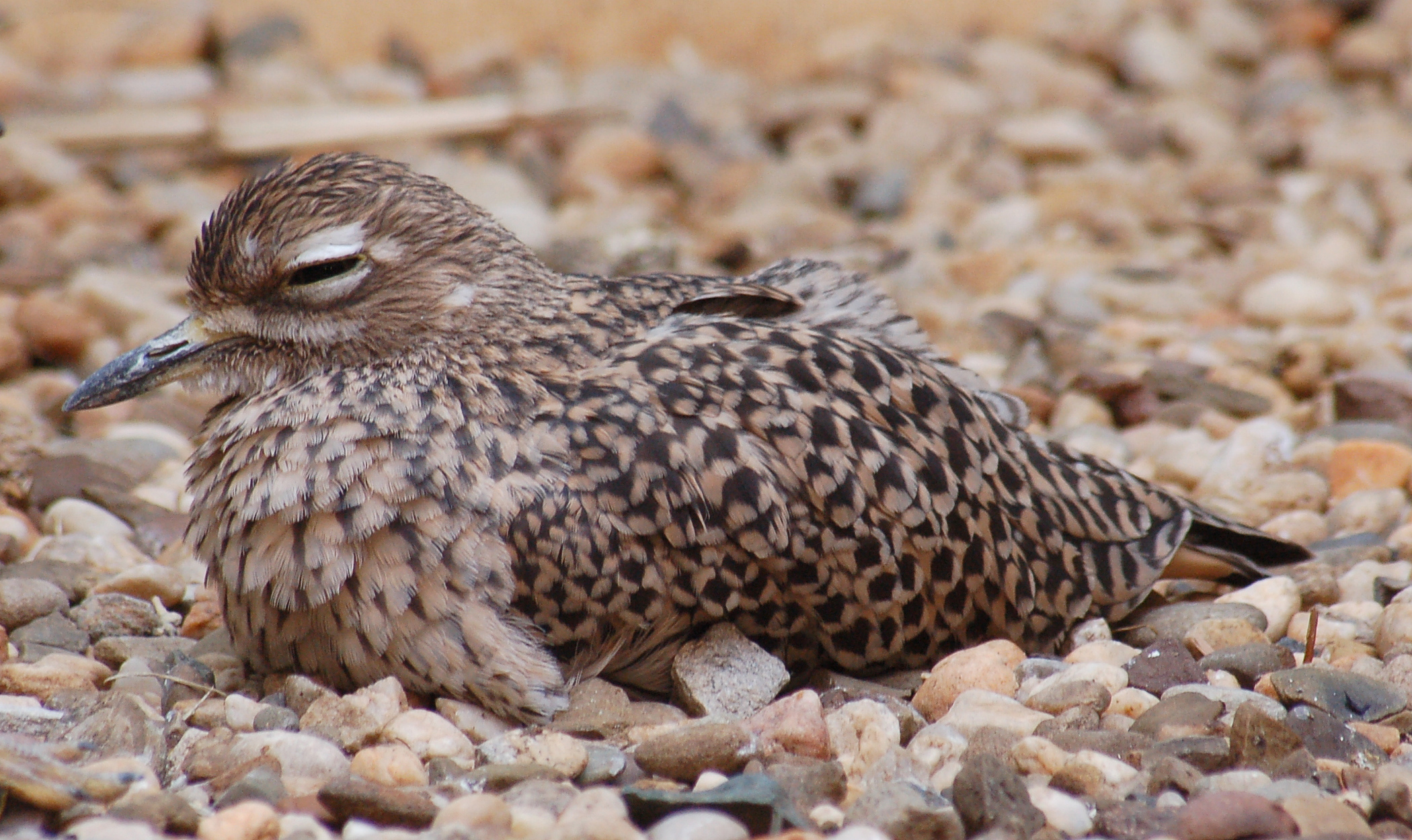
Spotted thick-knee, a scarce and little-known nocturnal bird

The thick-knees are a group of largely tropical waders in the family Burhinidae. They are found worldwide within the tropical zone, with some species also breeding in temperate Europe and Australia. They are medium to large waders with strong black or yellow-black bills, large yellow eyes and cryptic plumage. Despite being classed as waders, most species have a preference for arid or semi-arid habitats.

- Water thick-knee, Burhinus vermiculatus
- Spotted thick-knee, Burhinus capensis

== Stilts and avocets ==
Order: Charadriiformes Family: Recurvirostridae

Recurvirostridae is a family of large wading birds, which includes the avocets and stilts. The avocets have long legs and long up-curved bills. The stilts have extremely long legs and long, thin, straight bills.

- Black-winged stilt, Himantopus himantopus
- Pied avocet, Recurvirostra avosetta

== Plovers and lapwings ==
Order: Charadriiformes Family: Charadriidae

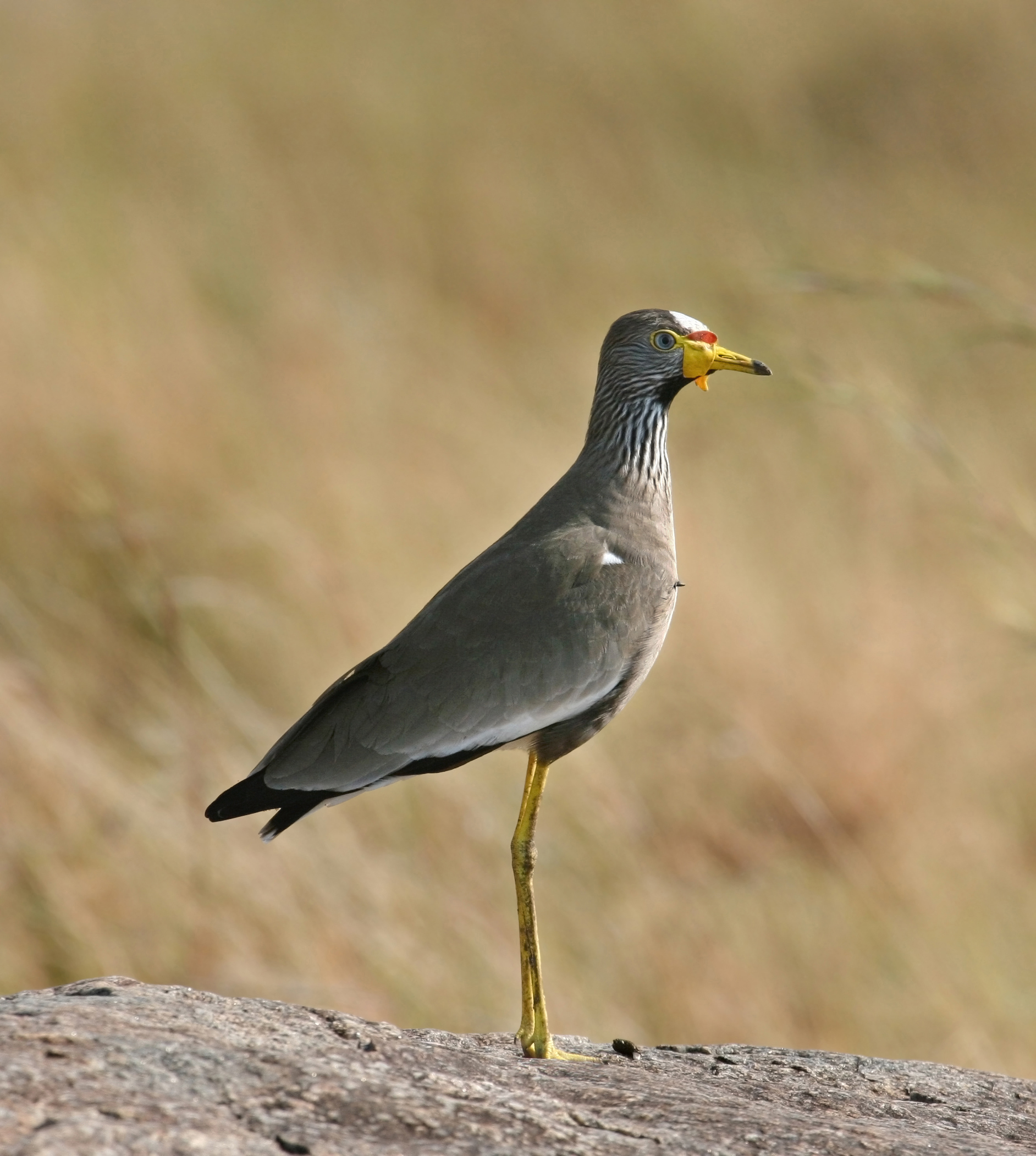
Wattled lapwing, locally fairly common in short, moist grassland

The family Charadriidae includes the plovers, dotterels and lapwings. They are small to medium-sized birds with compact bodies, short, thick necks and long, usually pointed, wings. They are found in open country worldwide, mostly in habitats near water.

- Black-bellied plover, Pluvialis squatarola
- Pacific golden-plover, Pluvialis fulva (A)
- Long-toed lapwing, Vanellus crassirostris
- Blacksmith lapwing, Vanellus armatus
- Spur-winged lapwing, Vanellus spinosus
- White-headed lapwing, Vanellus albiceps
- Senegal lapwing, Vanellus lugubris
- Crowned lapwing, Vanellus coronatus
- Wattled lapwing, Vanellus senegallus
- Greater sand-plover, Charadrius leschenaultii (A)
- Caspian plover, Charadrius asiaticus
- Kittlitz's plover, Charadrius pecuarius
- Common ringed plover, Charadrius hiaticula
- Three-banded plover, Charadrius tricollaris
- White-fronted plover, Charadrius marginatus

== Painted-snipes ==
Order: Charadriiformes Family: Rostratulidae

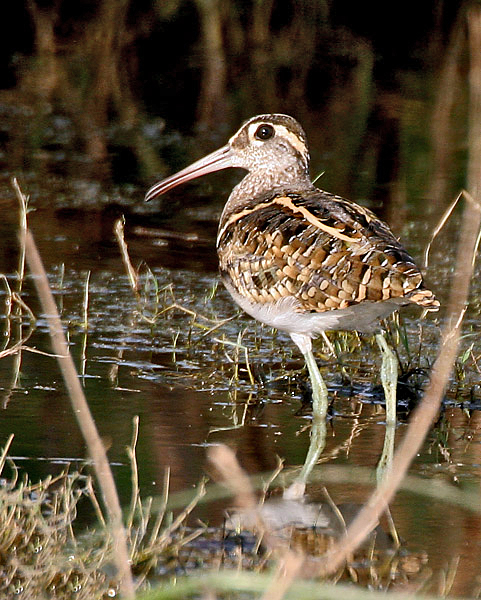
Greater painted-snipe, a difficult-to-see bird of marshes and the edges of water

Painted-snipes are short-legged, long-billed birds similar in shape to the true snipes, but more brightly coloured.

- Greater painted-snipe, Rostratula benghalensis

== Jacanas ==
Order: Charadriiformes Family: Jacanidae

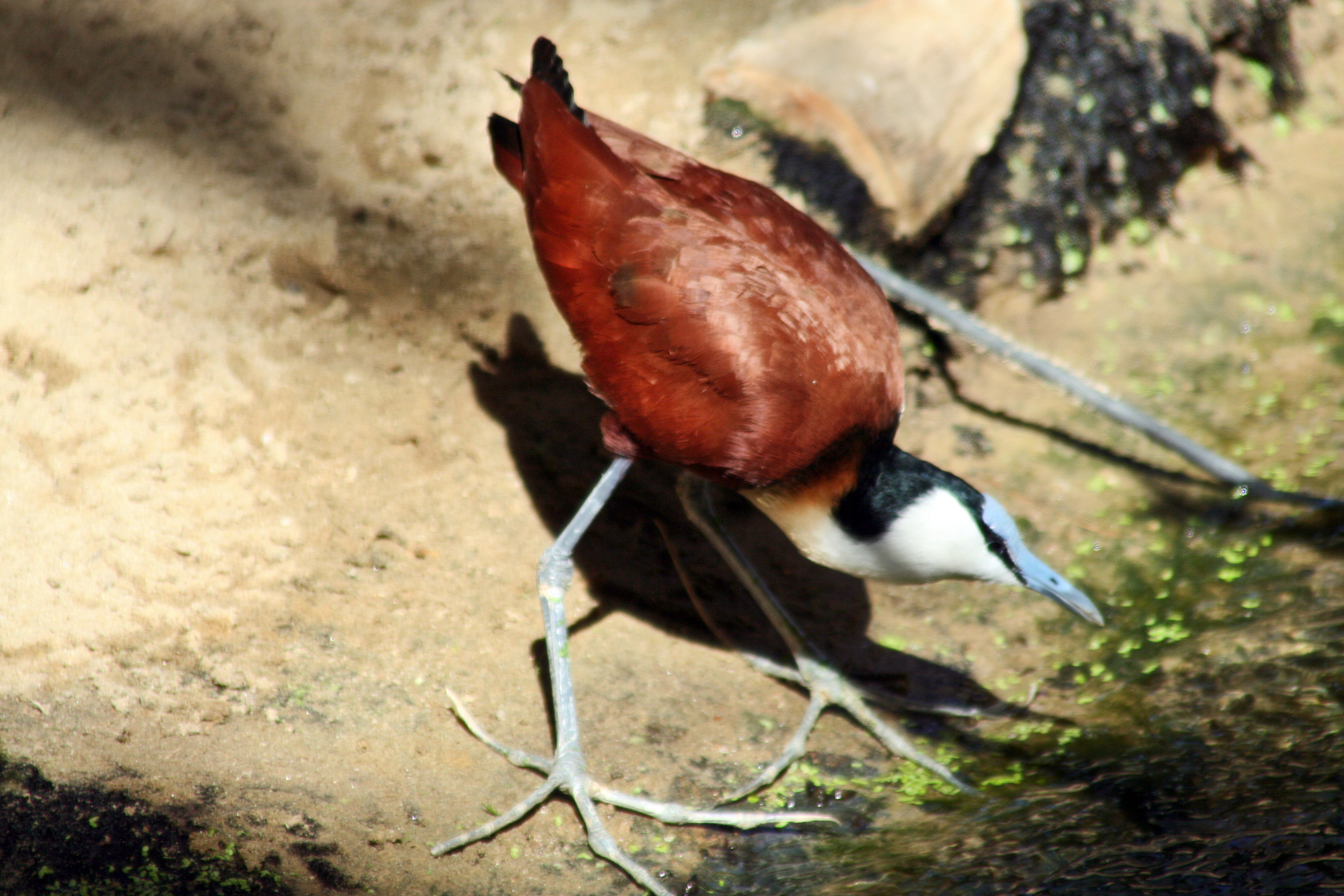
African jacana, very common in well-vegetated wetlands

The jacanas are a group of tropical waders in the family Jacanidae. They are found throughout the tropics. They are identifiable by their huge feet and claws which enable them to walk on floating vegetation in the shallow lakes that are their preferred habitat.

- Lesser jacana, Microparra capensis
- African jacana, Actophilornis africanus

== Sandpipers and allies ==
Order: Charadriiformes Family: Scolopacidae

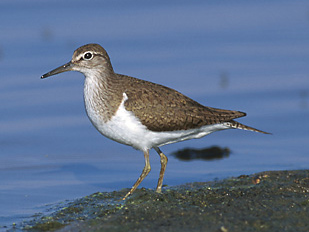
Common sandpiper, a very common Eurasian migrant

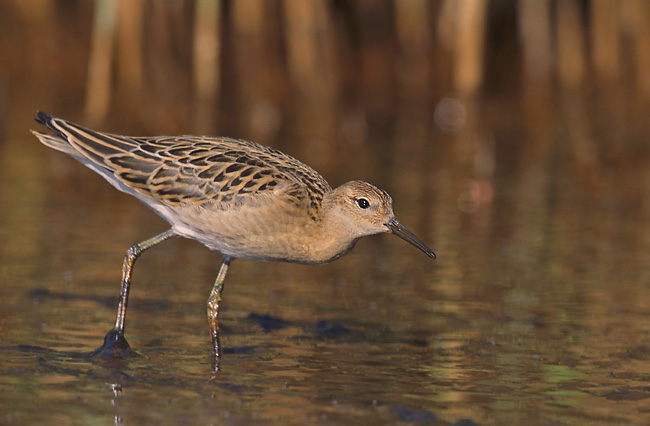
Ruff, a widespread migrant to wetlands and grassland

Scolopacidae is a large diverse family of small to medium-sized shorebirds including the sandpipers, curlews, godwits, shanks, tattlers, woodcocks, snipes, dowitchers and phalaropes. The majority of these species eat small invertebrates picked out of the mud or soil. Variation in length of legs and bills enables multiple species to feed in the same habitat, particularly on the coast, without direct competition for food.

- Whimbrel, Numenius phaeopus
- Eurasian curlew, Numenius arquata
- Bar-tailed godwit, Limosa lapponica
- Black-tailed godwit, Limosa limosa (A)
- Ruddy turnstone, Arenaria interpres
- Ruff, Calidris pugnax
- Broad-billed sandpiper, Calidris falcinellus (A)
- Curlew sandpiper, Calidris ferruginea
- Sanderling, Calidris alba
- Little stint, Calidris minuta
- Great snipe, Gallinago media
- Common snipe, Gallinago gallinago (A)
- African snipe, Gallinago nigripennis
- Terek sandpiper, Xenus cinereus
- Common sandpiper, Actitis hypoleucos
- Green sandpiper, Tringa ochropus
- Spotted redshank, Tringa erythropus (A)
- Common greenshank, Tringa nebularia
- Marsh sandpiper, Tringa stagnatilis
- Wood sandpiper, Tringa glareola
- Common redshank, Tringa totanus

== Buttonquail ==
Order: Charadriiformes Family: Turnicidae

The buttonquail are small, drab, running birds which resemble the true quails. The female is the brighter of the sexes and initiates courtship. The male incubates the eggs and tends the young.

- Small buttonquail, Turnix sylvaticus
- Black-rumped buttonquail, Turnix nanus

== Pratincoles and coursers ==
Order: Charadriiformes Family: Glareolidae

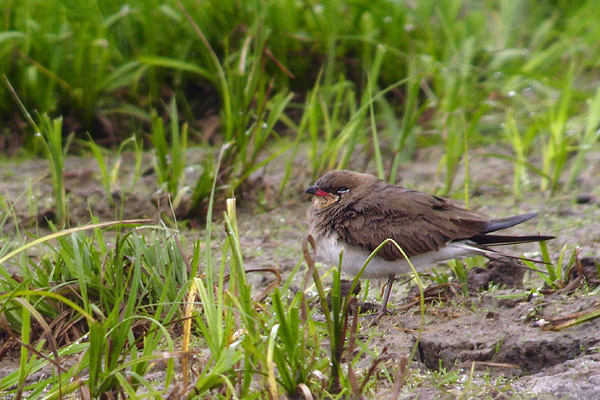
Collared pratincole, a colonial nester of grassland and wetlands

Glareolidae is a family of wading birds comprising the pratincoles, which have short legs, long pointed wings and long forked tails, and the coursers, which have long legs, short wings and long, pointed bills which curve downwards.

- Temminck's courser, Cursorius temminckii
- Bronze-winged courser, Rhinoptilus chalcopterus
- Collared pratincole, Glareola pratincola
- Black-winged pratincole, Glareola nordmanni (A)
- Rock pratincole, Glareola nuchalis

== Gulls, terns, and skimmers ==
Order: Charadriiformes Family: Laridae

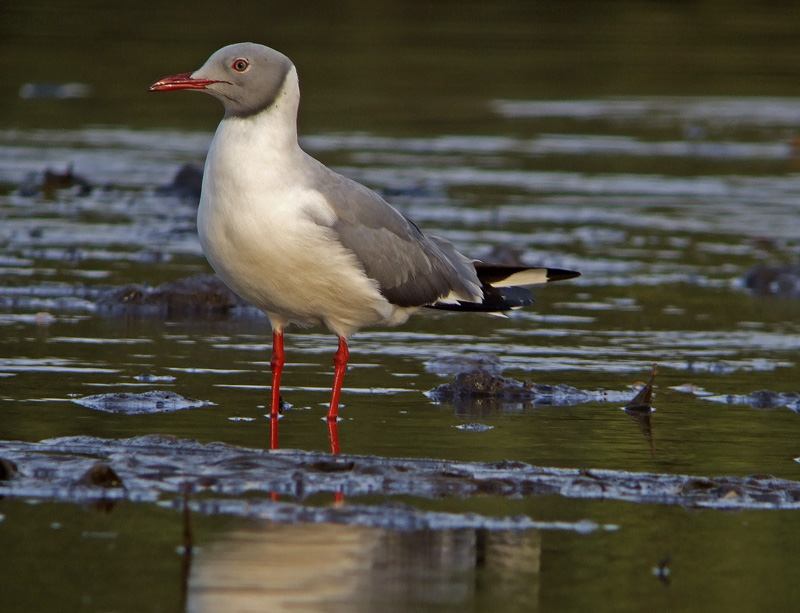
Gray-hooded gull, a resident of larger lakes and rivers

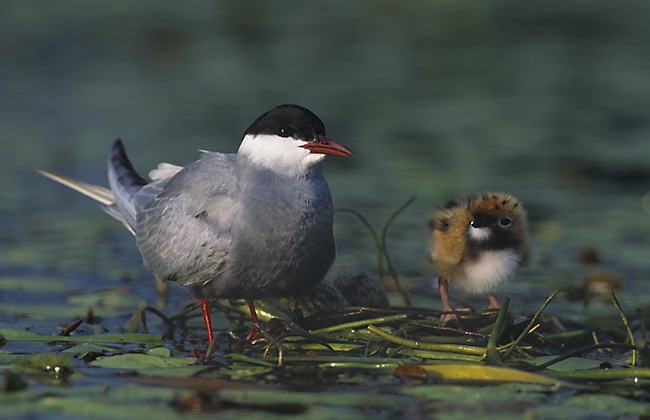
Whiskered tern, frequent at Lake Chilwa where there is a breeding colony

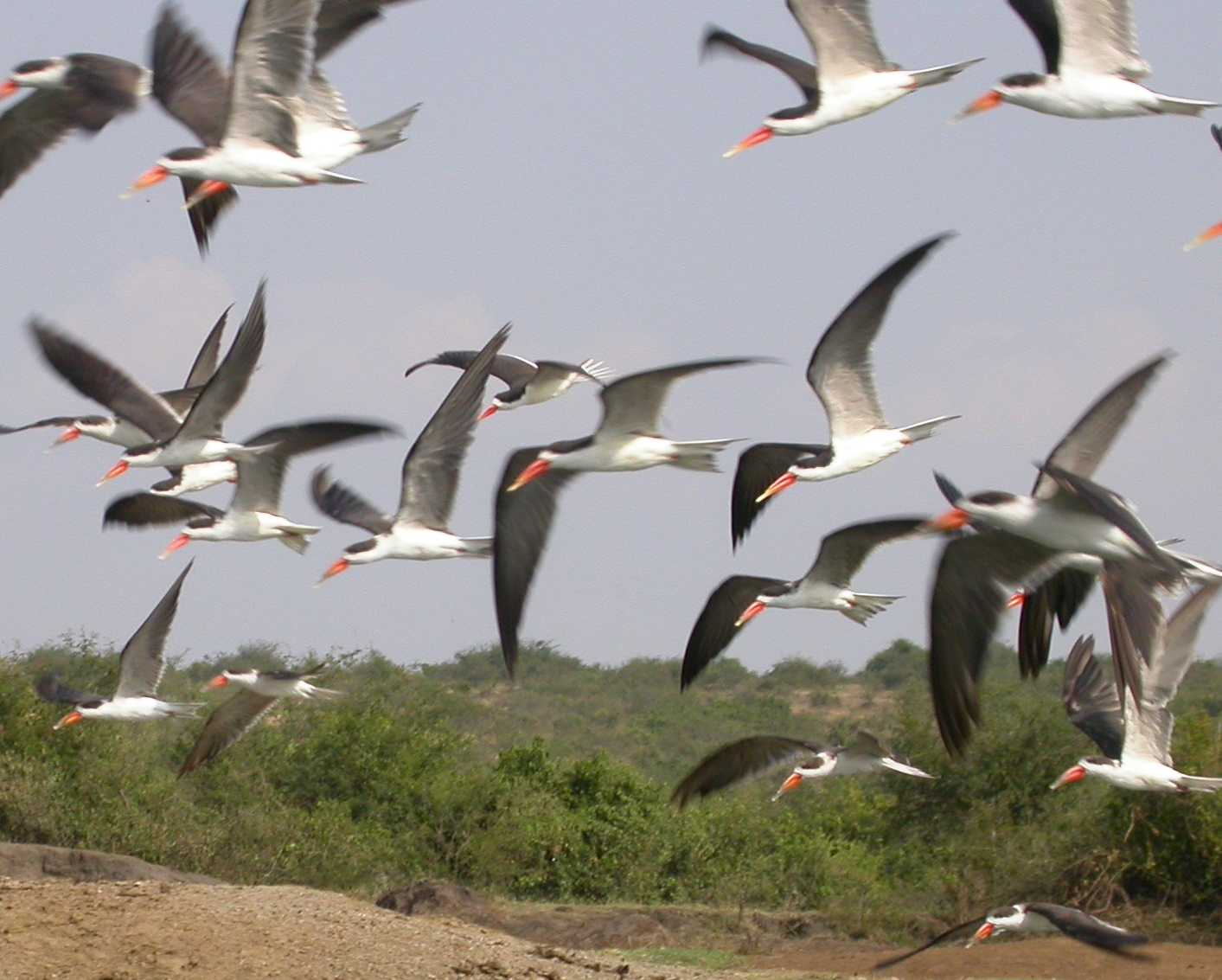
African skimmer, breeds along the River Shire

Laridae is a family of medium to large seabirds, the gulls, terns, and skimmers. Gulls are typically grey or white, often with black markings on the head or wings. They have stout, longish bills and webbed feet. Terns are a group of generally medium to large seabirds typically with grey or white plumage, often with black markings on the head. Most terns hunt fish by diving but some pick insects off the surface of fresh water. Terns are generally long-lived birds, with several species known to live in excess of 30 years. Skimmers are a small family of tropical tern-like birds. They have an elongated lower mandible which they use to feed by flying low over the water surface and skimming the water for small fish.

- Gray-hooded gull, Chroicocephalus cirrocephalus
- Black-headed gull, Chroicocephalus ridibundus (A)
- Lesser black-backed gull, Larus fuscus
- Sooty tern, Onychoprion fuscatus (A)
- Gull-billed tern, Gelochelidon nilotica
- White-winged tern, Chlidonias leucopterus
- Whiskered tern, Chlidonias hybrida
- Common tern, Sterna hirundo (A)
- African skimmer, Rynchops flavirostris

== Storks ==
Order: Ciconiiformes Family: Ciconiidae

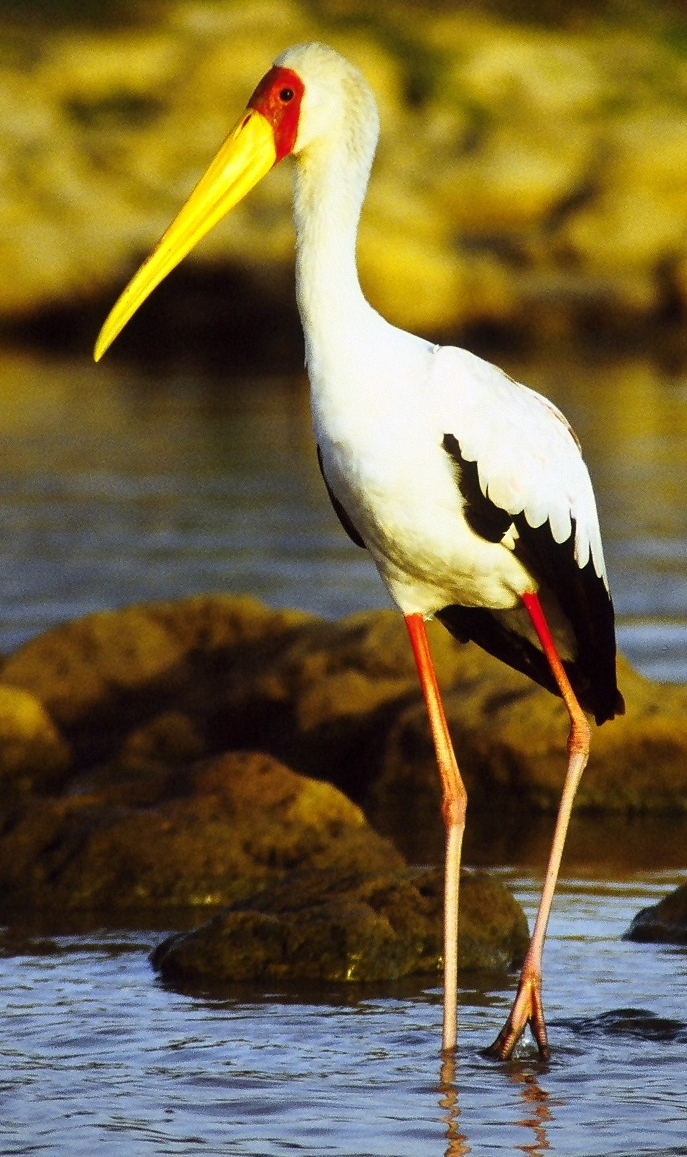
Yellow-billed stork, a widespread and dispersive bird of wetlands

Storks are large, long-legged, long-necked, wading birds with long, stout bills. Storks are mute, but bill-clattering is an important mode of communication at the nest. Their nests can be large and may be reused for many years. Many species are migratory.

- African openbill, Anastomus lamelligerus
- Black stork, Ciconia nigra
- Abdim's stork, Ciconia abdimii
- African woolly-necked stork, Ciconia microscelis
- White stork, Ciconia ciconia
- Saddle-billed stork, Ephippiorhynchus senegalensis
- Marabou stork, Leptoptilos crumenifer
- Yellow-billed stork, Mycteria ibis

== Anhingas ==
Order: Suliformes Family: Anhingidae

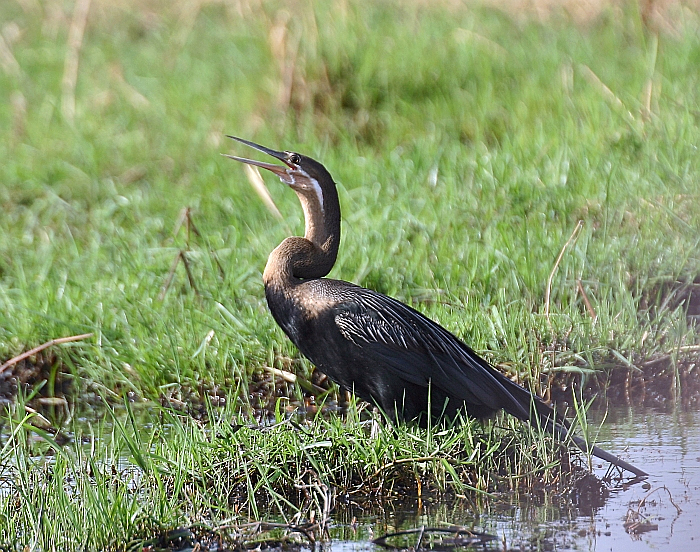
African darter, a local resident of lakes and rivers

Anhingas or darters are often called "snake-birds" because of their long thin neck, which gives a snake-like appearance when they swim with their bodies submerged. The males have black and dark-brown plumage, an erectile crest on the nape and a larger bill than the female. The females have much paler plumage especially on the neck and underparts. The darters have completely webbed feet and their legs are short and set far back on the body. Their plumage is somewhat permeable, like that of cormorants, and they spread their wings to dry after diving.

- African darter, Anhinga rufa

== Cormorants and shags ==
Order: Suliformes Family: Phalacrocoracidae

Phalacrocoracidae is a family of medium to large coastal, fish-eating seabirds that includes cormorants and shags. Plumage colouration varies, with the majority having mainly dark plumage, some species being black-and-white and a few being colourful.

- Long-tailed cormorant, Microcarbo africanus
- Great cormorant, Phalacrocorax carbo

== Pelicans ==
Order: Pelecaniformes Family: Pelecanidae

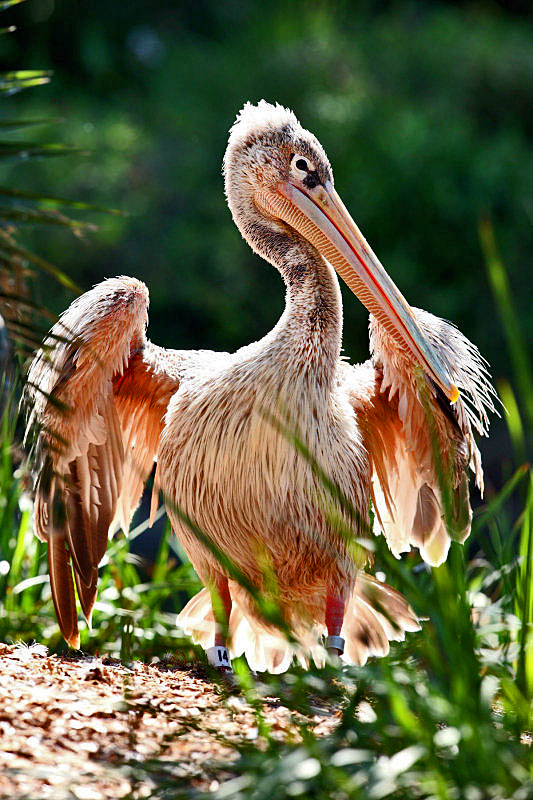
Pink-backed pelican, there are several breeding colonies in the south of the country.

Pelicans are large water birds with a distinctive pouch under their beak. As with other members of the order Pelecaniformes, they have webbed feet with four toes.

- Great white pelican, Pelecanus onocrotalus
- Pink-backed pelican, Pelecanus rufescens

== Hamerkop ==
Order: Pelecaniformes Family: Scopidae

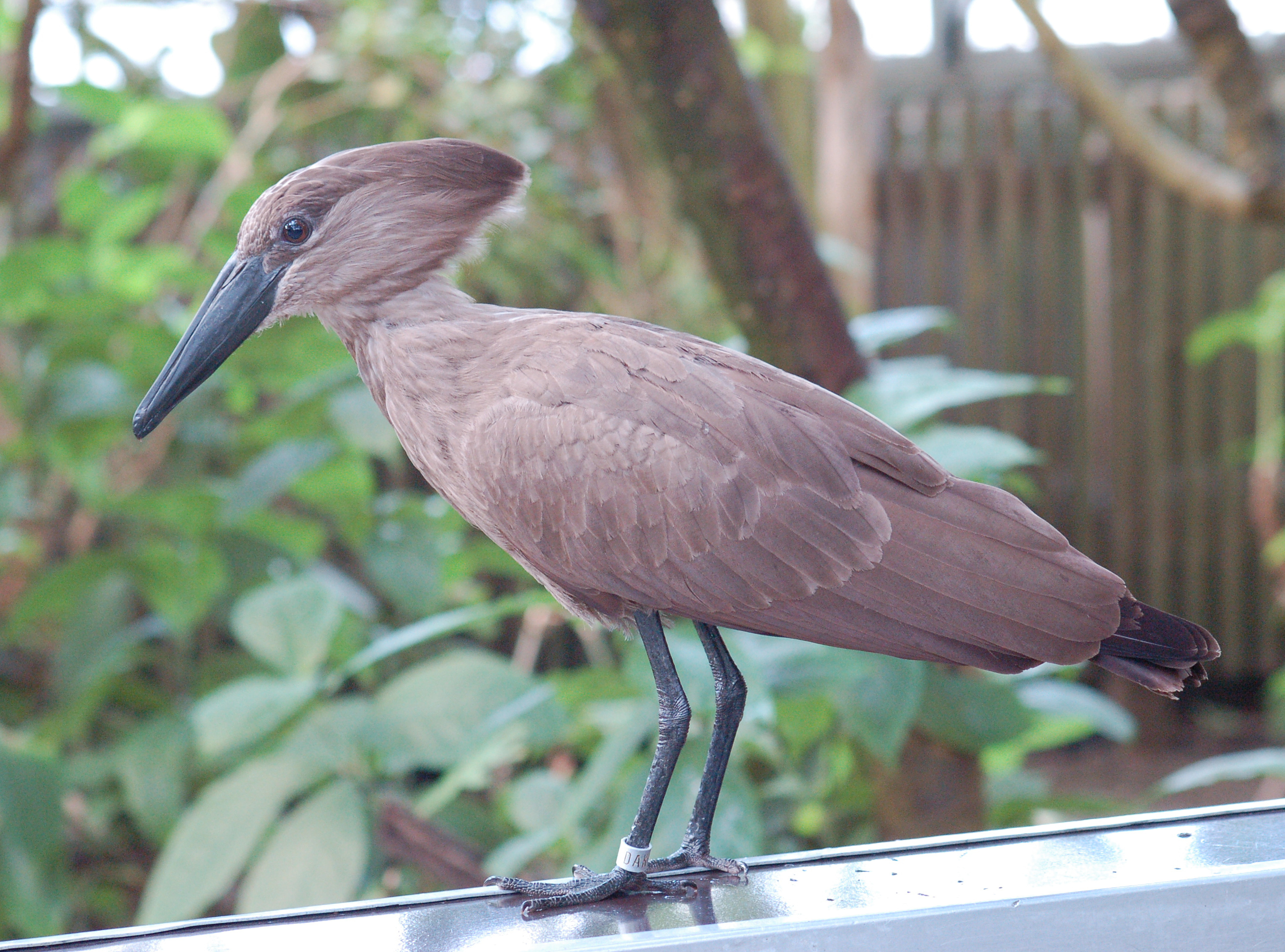
Hamerkop, a common resident

The hamerkop is a medium-sized bird with a long shaggy crest. The shape of its head with a curved bill and crest at the back is reminiscent of a hammer, hence its name. Its plumage is drab-brown all over.

- Hamerkop, Scopus umbretta

== Herons, egrets, and bitterns ==
Order: Pelecaniformes Family: Ardeidae

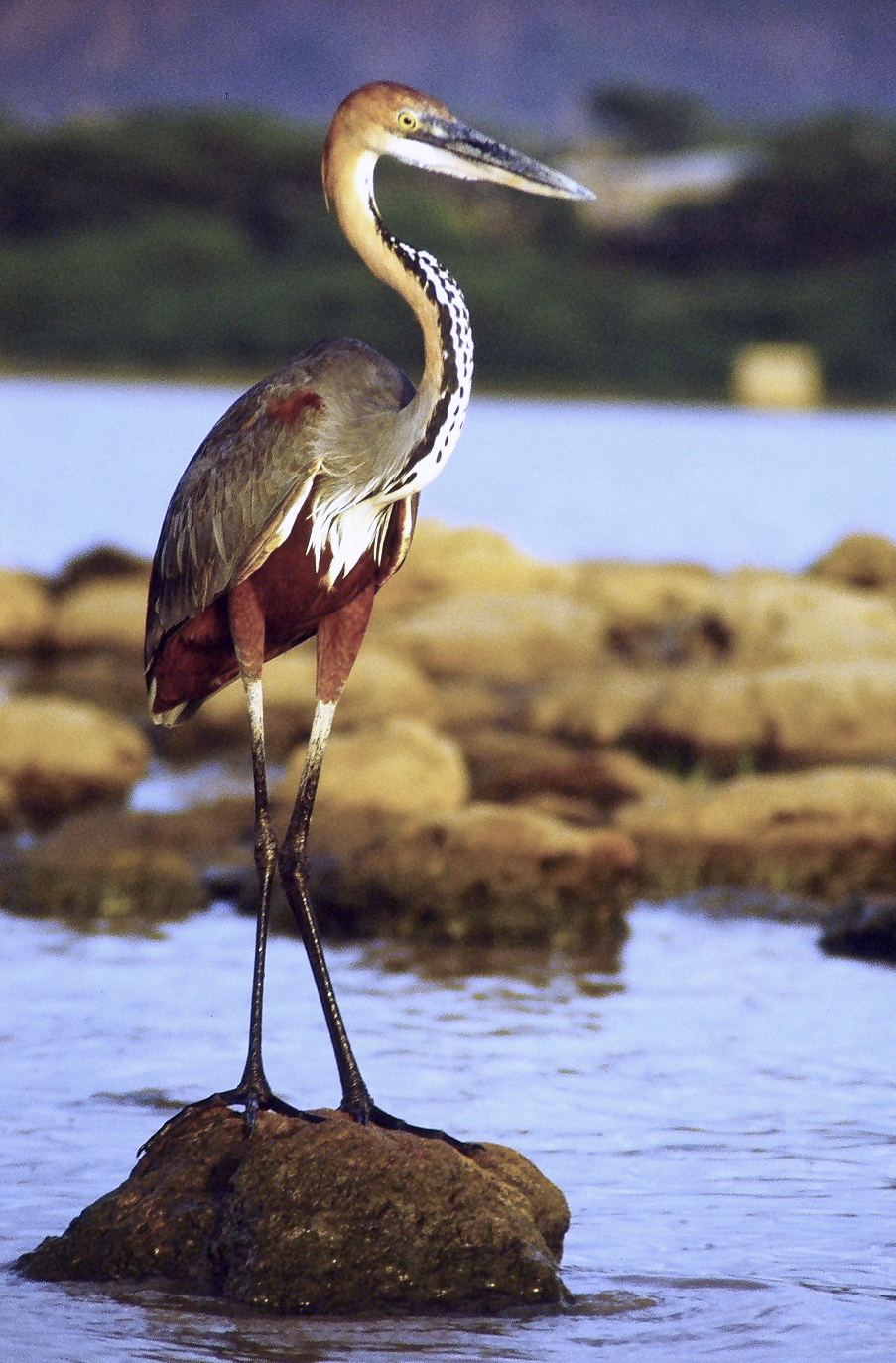
Goliath heron, a shy resident of large bodies of water

The family Ardeidae contains the bitterns, herons and egrets. Herons and egrets are medium to large wading birds with long necks and legs. Bitterns tend to be shorter necked and more wary. Members of Ardeidae fly with their necks retracted, unlike other long-necked birds such as storks, ibises and spoonbills.

- Little bittern, Ixobrychus minutus
- Dwarf bittern, Ixobrychus sturmii
- Gray heron, Ardea cinerea
- Black-headed heron, Ardea melanocephala
- Goliath heron, Ardea goliath
- Purple heron, Ardea purpurea
- Great egret, Ardea alba
- Intermediate egret, Ardea intermedia
- Little egret, Egretta garzetta
- Black heron, Egretta ardesiaca
- Cattle egret, Bubulcus ibis
- Squacco heron, Ardeola ralloides
- Malagasy pond-heron, Ardeola idae
- Rufous-bellied heron, Ardeola rufiventris
- Striated heron, Butorides striata
- Black-crowned night-heron, Nycticorax nycticorax
- White-backed night-heron, Gorsachius leuconotus

== Ibises and spoonbills ==
Order: Pelecaniformes Family: Threskiornithidae

Threskiornithidae is a family of large terrestrial and wading birds which includes the ibises and spoonbills. They have long, broad wings with 11 primary and about 20 secondary feathers. They are strong fliers and despite their size and weight, very capable soarers.

- Glossy ibis, Plegadis falcinellus
- African sacred ibis, Threskiornis aethiopicus
- Hadada ibis, Bostrychia hagedash
- African spoonbill, Platalea alba

== Secretarybird ==
Order: Accipitriformes Family: Sagittariidae

The secretarybird is a bird of prey in the order Accipitriformes but is easily distinguished from other raptors by its long crane-like legs.

- Secretarybird, Sagittarius serpentarius

== Osprey ==
Order: Accipitriformes Family: Pandionidae

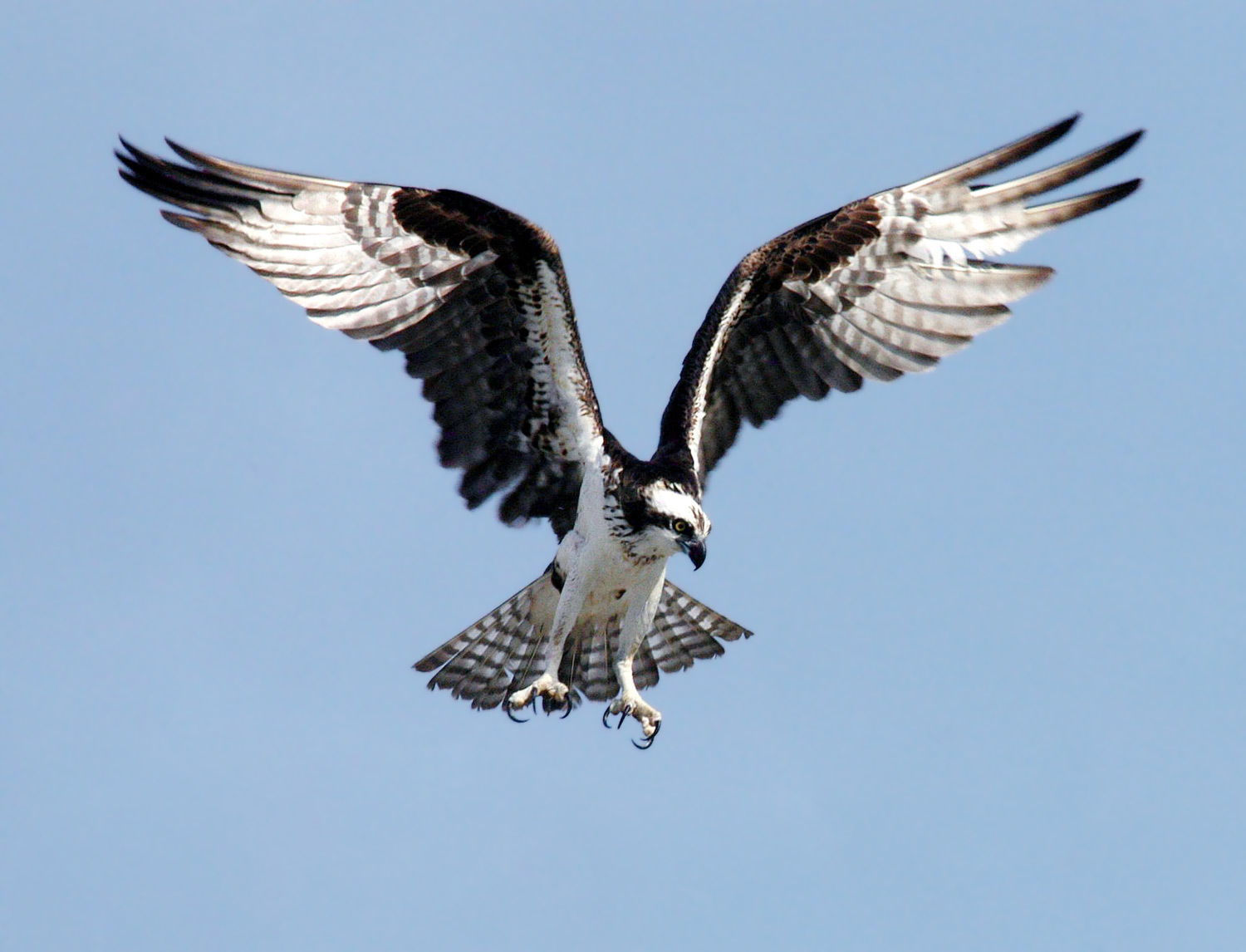
Osprey, a migrant from the Northern Hemisphere

The family Pandionidae contains only one species, the osprey. The osprey is a medium-large raptor which is a specialist fish-eater with a worldwide distribution.

- Osprey, Pandion haliaetus

== Hawks, eagles, and kites ==
Order: Accipitriformes Family: Accipitridae

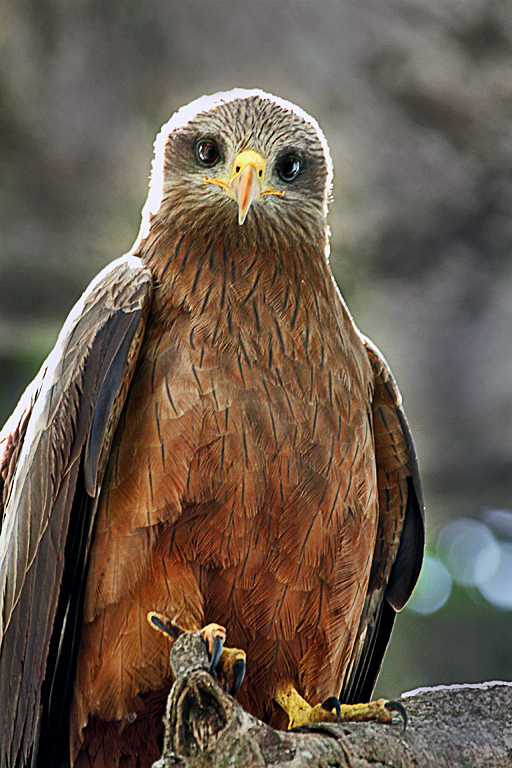
Yellow-billed kite, the breeding form of the black kite

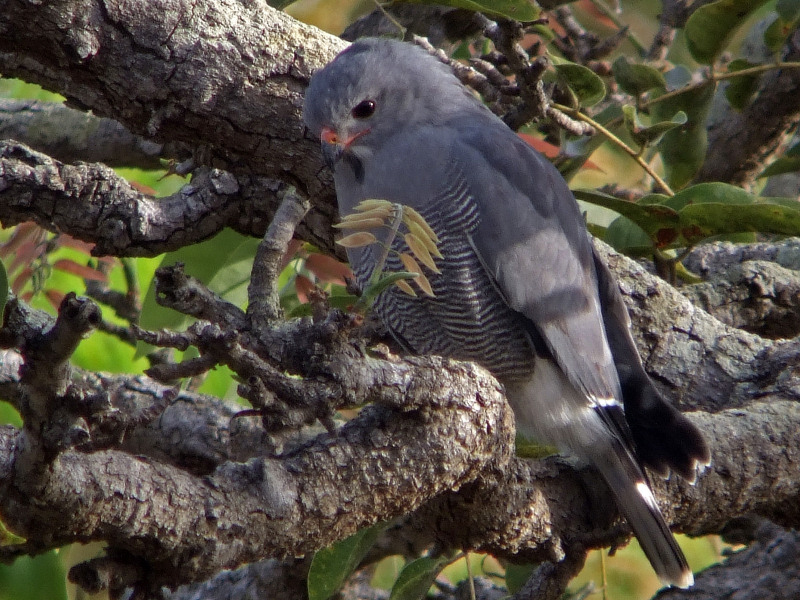
Lizard buzzard, common in woodland throughout Malawi

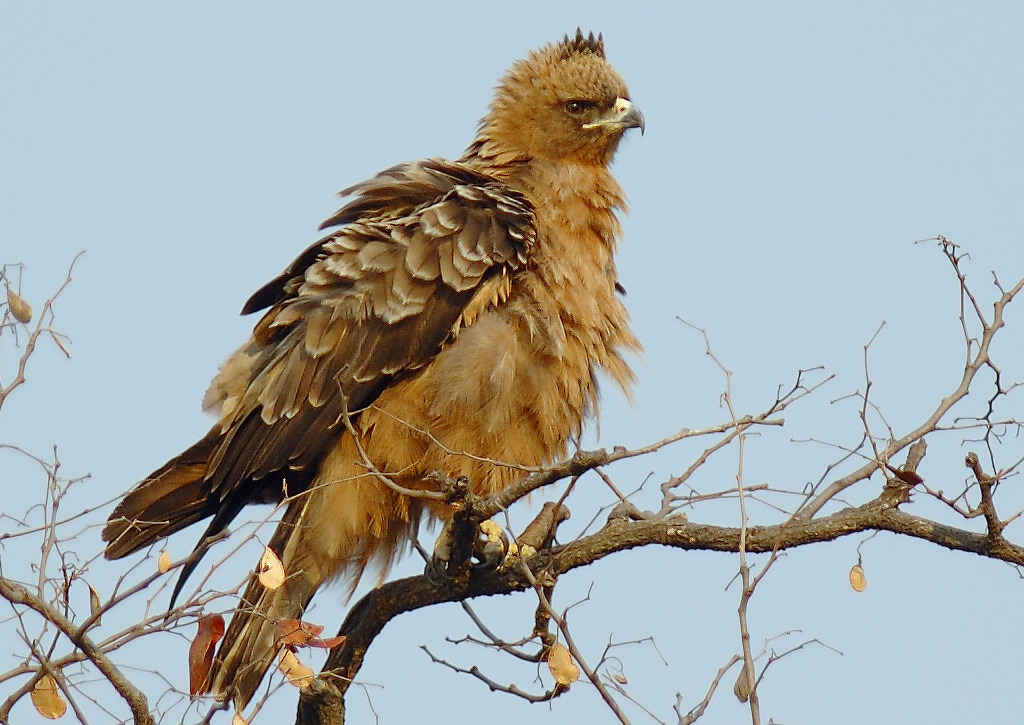
Wahlberg's eagle, a breeding migrant present from August to April

Accipitridae is a family of birds of prey, which includes hawks, eagles, kites, harriers and Old World vultures. These birds have powerful hooked beaks for tearing flesh from their prey, strong legs, powerful talons and keen eyesight.

- Black-winged kite, Elanus caeruleus
- African harrier-hawk, Polyboroides typus
- Palm-nut vulture, Gypohierax angolensis
- Egyptian vulture, Neophron percnopterus
- European honey-buzzard, Pernis apivorus
- African cuckoo-hawk, Aviceda cuculoides
- White-headed vulture, Trigonoceps occipitalis
- Lappet-faced vulture, Torgos tracheliotos
- Hooded vulture, Necrosyrtes monachus
- White-backed vulture, Gyps africanus
- Rüppell's griffon, Gyps rueppelli (A)
- Bateleur, Terathopius ecaudatus
- Black-chested snake-eagle, Circaetus pectoralis
- Brown snake-eagle, Circaetus cinereus
- Banded snake-eagle, Circaetus cinerascens
- Bat hawk, Macheiramphus alcinus
- Crowned eagle, Stephanoaetus coronatus
- Martial eagle, Polemaetus bellicosus
- Long-crested eagle, Lophaetus occipitalis
- Lesser spotted eagle, Clanga pomarina
- Wahlberg's eagle, Hieraaetus wahlbergi
- Booted eagle, Hieraaetus pennatus
- Ayres's hawk-eagle, Hieraaetus ayresii
- Tawny eagle, Aquila rapax
- Steppe eagle, Aquila nipalensis
- Verreaux's eagle, Aquila verreauxii
- African hawk-eagle, Aquila spilogaster
- Lizard buzzard, Kaupifalco monogrammicus
- Dark chanting-goshawk, Melierax metabates
- Gabar goshawk, Micronisus gabar
- Eurasian marsh-harrier, Circus aeruginosus
- African marsh-harrier, Circus ranivorus
- Pallid harrier, Circus macrourus
- Montagu's harrier, Circus pygargus
- African goshawk, Accipiter tachiro
- Shikra, Accipiter badius
- Little sparrowhawk, Accipiter minullus
- Ovambo sparrowhawk, Accipiter ovampensis
- Rufous-breasted sparrowhawk, Accipiter rufiventris
- Black goshawk, Accipiter melanoleucus
- Black kite, Milvus migrans
- African fish-eagle, Haliaeetus vocifer
- Common buzzard, Buteo buteo
- Mountain buzzard, Buteo oreophilus
- Augur buzzard, Buteo augur

== Barn-owls ==
Order: Strigiformes Family: Tytonidae

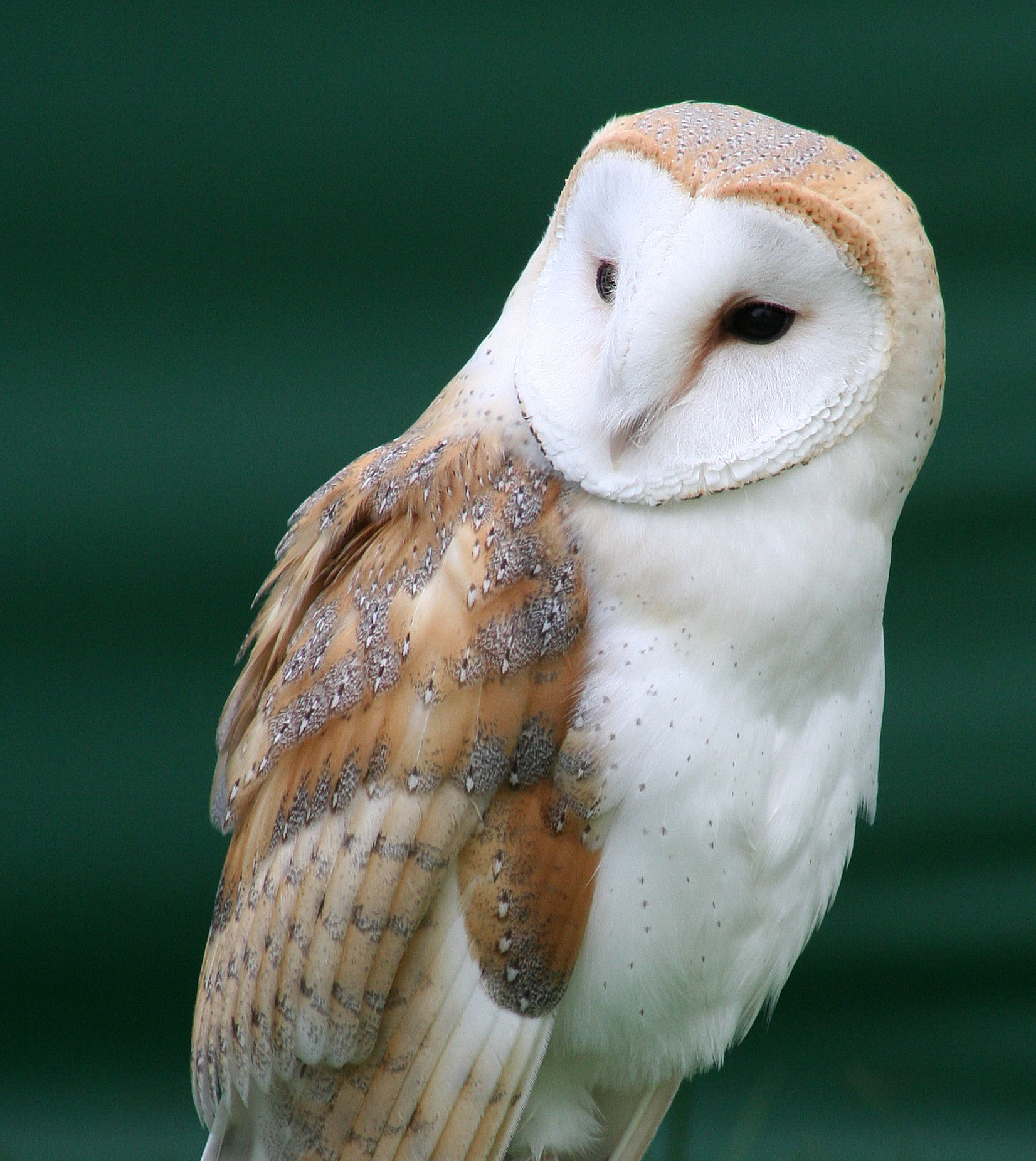
Barn owl, often around farms and villages

Barn-owls are medium to large owls with large heads and characteristic heart-shaped faces. They have long strong legs with powerful talons.

- African grass-owl, Tyto capensis (A)
- Western barn owl, Tyto alba

== Owls ==
Order: Strigiformes Family: Strigidae

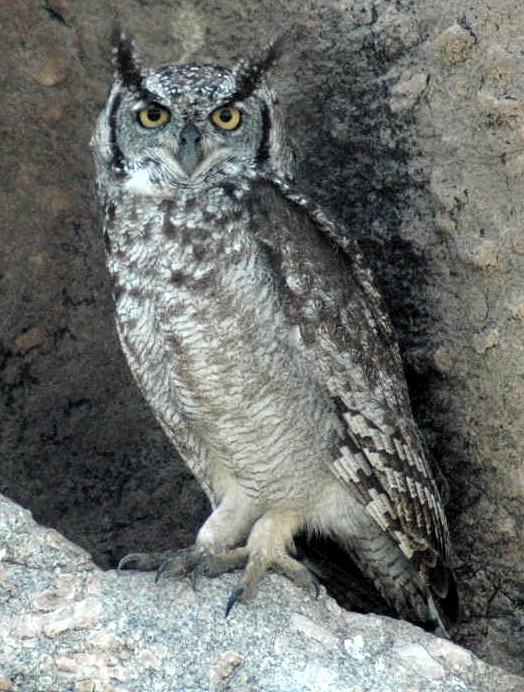
Spotted eagle-owl, common in many habitats

The typical owls are small to large solitary nocturnal birds of prey. They have large forward-facing eyes and ears, a hawk-like beak and a conspicuous circle of feathers around each eye called a facial disk.

- Eurasian scops-owl, Otus scops
- African scops-owl, Otus senegalensis
- Southern white-faced owl, Ptilopsis granti
- Cape eagle-owl, Bubo capensis (A)
- Spotted eagle-owl, Bubo africanus
- Verreaux's eagle-owl, Bubo lacteus
- Pel's fishing owl, Scotopelia peli
- Pearl-spotted owlet, Glaucidium perlatum
- African barred owlet, Glaucidium capense
- African wood-owl, Strix woodfordii
- Marsh owl, Asio capensis

== Mousebirds ==
Order: Coliiformes Family: Coliidae

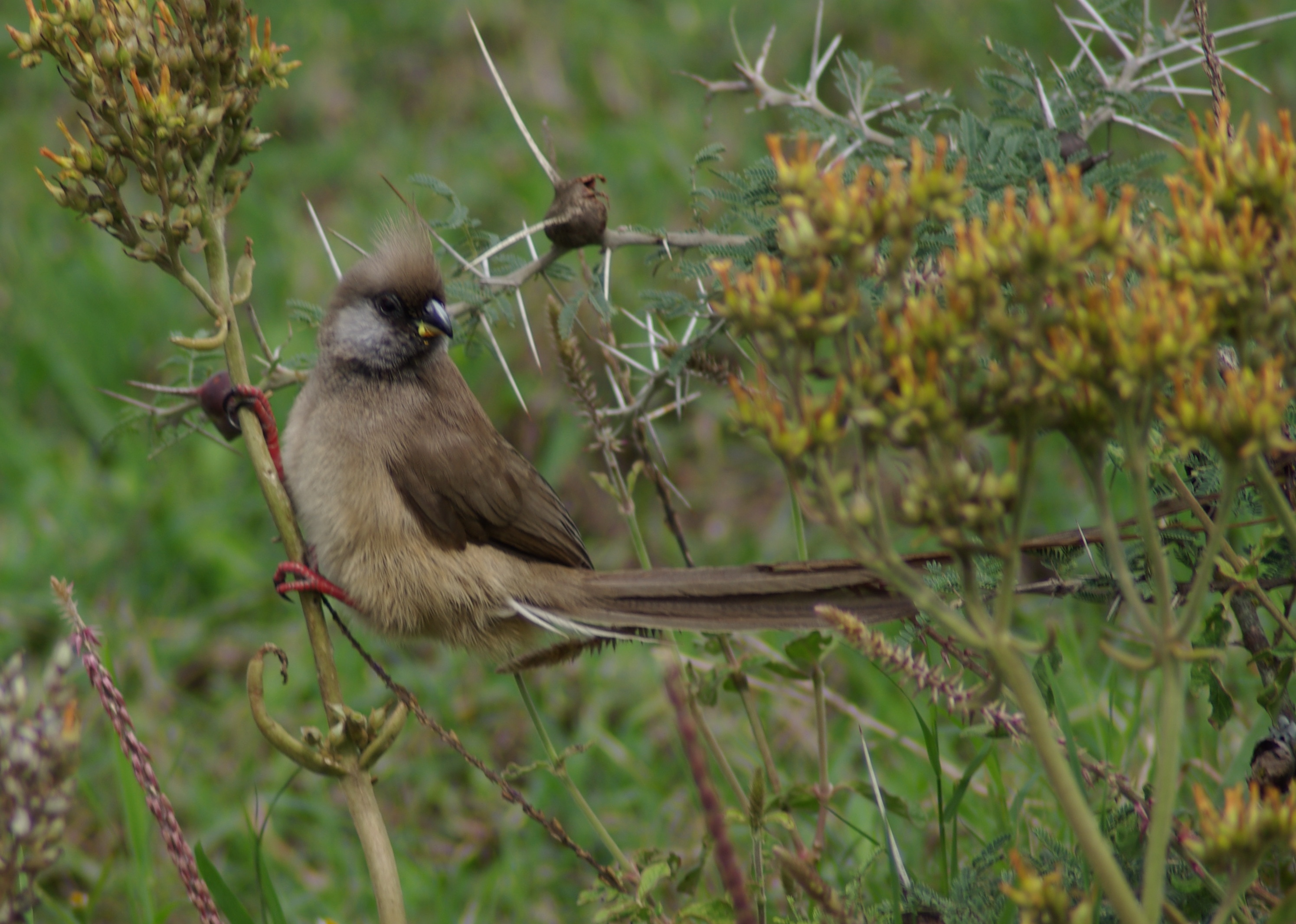
Speckled mousebird, a sociable bird which often visits gardens

The mousebirds are slender greyish or brown birds with soft, hairlike body feathers and very long thin tails. They are arboreal and scurry through the leaves like rodents in search of berries, fruit and buds. They are acrobatic and can feed upside down. All species have strong claws and reversible outer toes. They also have crests and stubby bills.

- Speckled mousebird, Colius striatus
- Red-faced mousebird, Urocolius indicus

== Trogons ==
Order: Trogoniformes Family: Trogonidae

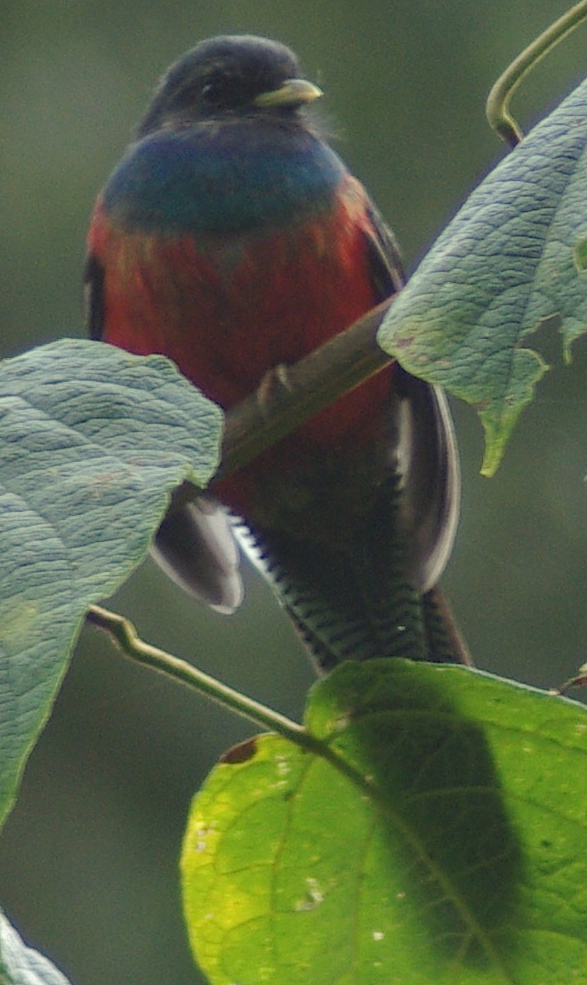
Bar-tailed trogon, resident in highland rainforests

The family Trogonidae includes trogons and quetzals. Found in tropical woodlands worldwide, they feed on insects and fruit, and their broad bills and weak legs reflect their diet and arboreal habits. Although their flight is fast, they are reluctant to fly any distance. Trogons have soft, often colourful, feathers with distinctive male and female plumage.

- Narina trogon, Apaloderma narina
- Bar-tailed trogon, Apaloderma vittatum

== Hoopoes ==
Order: Bucerotiformes Family: Upupidae

Hoopoes have black, white and orangey-pink colouring with a large erectile crest on their head.

- Eurasian hoopoe, Upupa epops

== Woodhoopoes and scimitarbills ==
Order: Bucerotiformes Family: Phoeniculidae

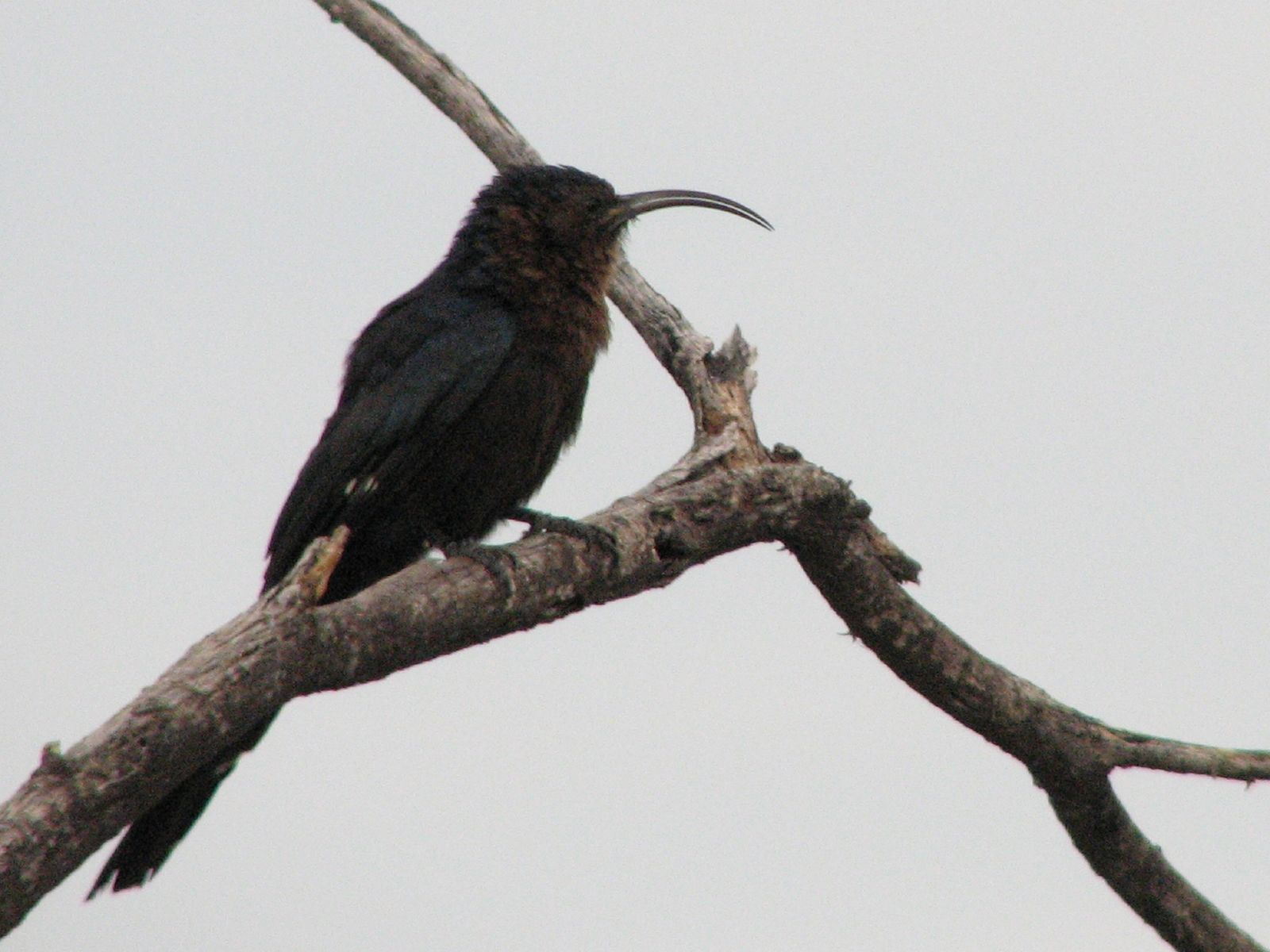
Common scimitar-bill, a widespread resident in woodland

The woodhoopoes are related to the kingfishers, rollers and hoopoes. They most resemble the hoopoes with their long curved bills, used to probe for insects, and short rounded wings. However, they differ in that they have metallic plumage, often blue, green or purple, and lack an erectile crest.

- Green woodhoopoe, Phoeniculus purpureus
- Common scimitarbill, Rhinopomastus cyanomelas

== Ground-hornbills ==
Order: Bucerotiformes Family: Bucorvidae

The ground-hornbills are terrestrial birds which feed almost entirely on insects, other birds, snakes, and amphibians.

- Southern ground-hornbill, Bucorvus leadbeateri

== Hornbills ==
Order: Bucerotiformes Family: Bucerotidae

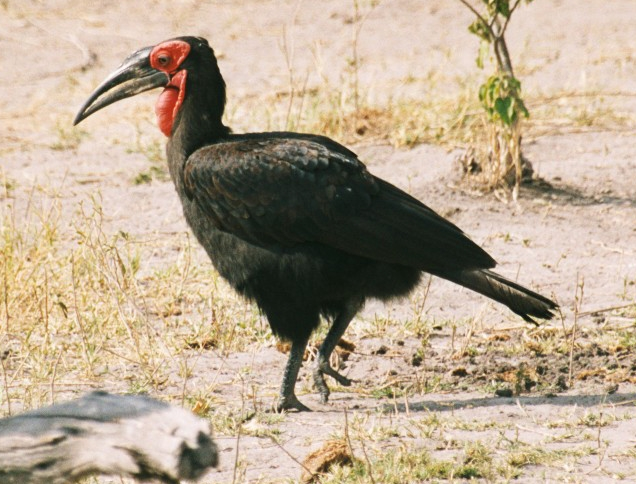
Southern ground-hornbill, disappearing from more densely populated areas

Hornbills are a group of birds whose bill is shaped like a cow's horn, but without a twist, sometimes with a casque on the upper mandible. Frequently, the bill is brightly coloured.

- Crowned hornbill, Lophoceros alboterminatus
- African gray hornbill, Lophoceros nasutus
- Pale-billed hornbill, Lophoceros pallidirostris
- Southern yellow-billed hornbill, Tockus leucomelas
- Southern red-billed hornbill, Tockus rufirostris
- Silvery-cheeked hornbill, Bycanistes brevis
- Trumpeter hornbill, Bycanistes bucinator

== Kingfishers ==
Order: Coraciiformes Family: Alcedinidae

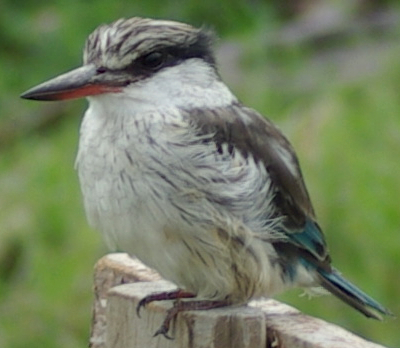
Striped kingfisher, widespread in open woodland and savannah

Kingfishers are medium-sized birds with large heads, long, pointed bills, short legs and stubby tails.

- Half-collared kingfisher, Alcedo semitorquata
- Malachite kingfisher, Corythornis cristatus
- African pygmy kingfisher, Ispidina picta
- Gray-headed kingfisher, Halcyon leucocephala
- Woodland kingfisher, Halcyon senegalensis
- Brown-hooded kingfisher, Halcyon albiventris
- Striped kingfisher, Halcyon chelicuti
- Giant kingfisher, Megaceryle maximus
- Pied kingfisher, Ceryle rudis

== Bee-eaters ==
Order: Coraciiformes Family: Meropidae

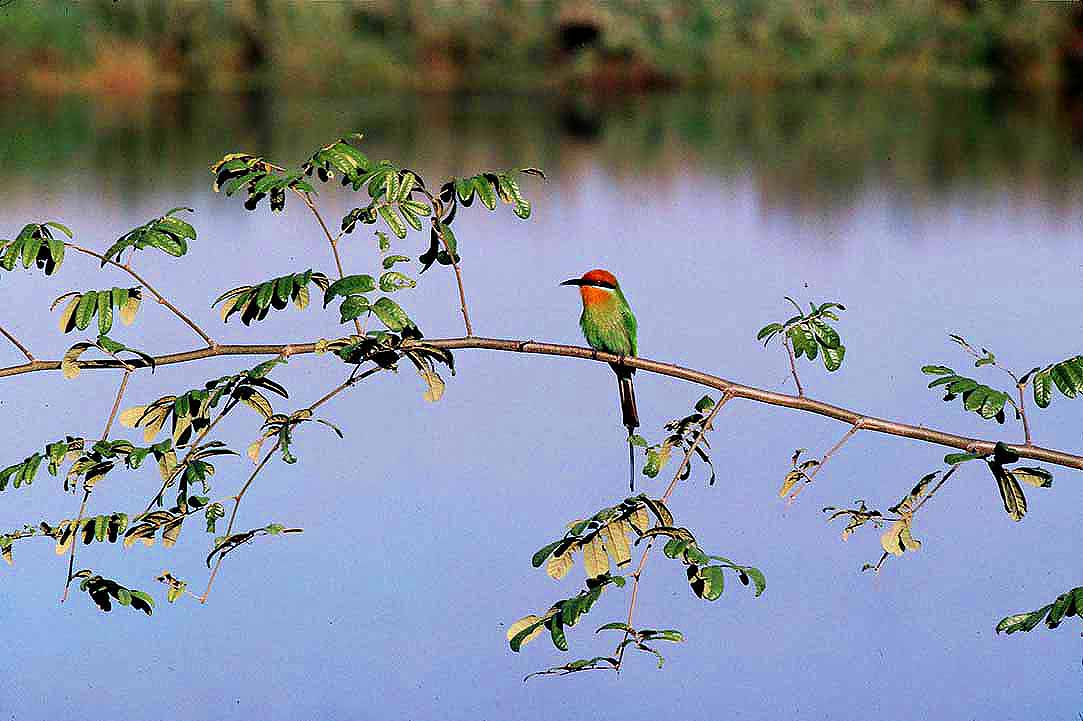
Boehm's bee-eater, a local resident most common near rivers

The bee-eaters are a group of near passerine birds in the family Meropidae. Most species are found in Africa but others occur in southern Europe, Madagascar, Australia and New Guinea. They are characterised by richly coloured plumage, slender bodies and usually elongated central tail feathers. All are colourful and have long downturned bills and pointed wings, which give them a swallow-like appearance when seen from afar.

- White-fronted bee-eater, Merops bullockoides
- Little bee-eater, Merops pusillus
- Swallow-tailed bee-eater, Merops hirundineus
- Böhm's bee-eater, Merops boehmi
- Blue-cheeked bee-eater, Merops persicus
- Madagascar bee-eater, Merops superciliosus
- European bee-eater, Merops apiaster
- Southern carmine bee-eater, Merops nubicoides

== Rollers ==
Order: Coraciiformes Family: Coraciidae

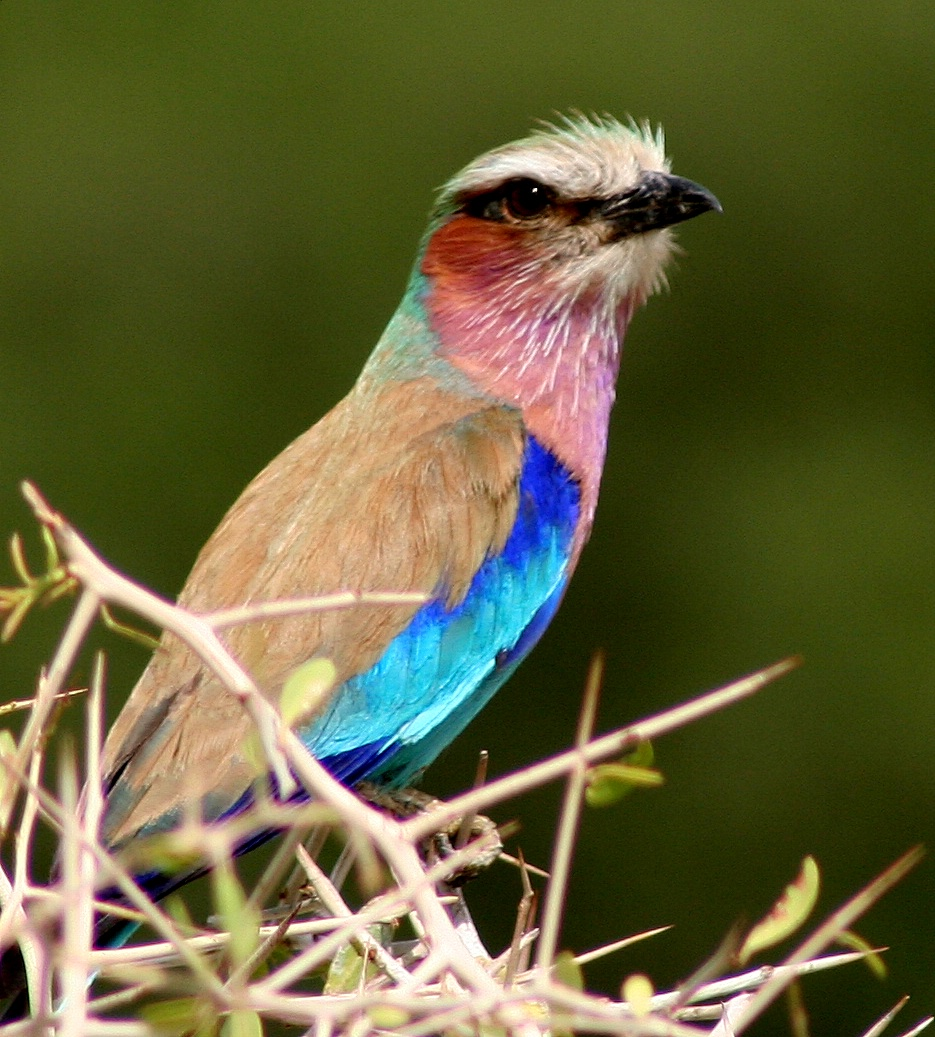
Lilac-breasted roller, widespread in open woodland and savannah

Rollers resemble crows in size and build, but are more closely related to the kingfishers and bee-eaters. They share the colourful appearance of those groups with blues and browns predominating. The two inner front toes are connected, but the outer toe is not.

- European roller, Coracias garrulus
- Lilac-breasted roller, Coracias caudatus
- Racket-tailed roller, Coracias spatulatus
- Rufous-crowned roller, Coracias naevius
- Broad-billed roller, Eurystomus glaucurus

== African barbets ==
Order: Piciformes Family: Lybiidae

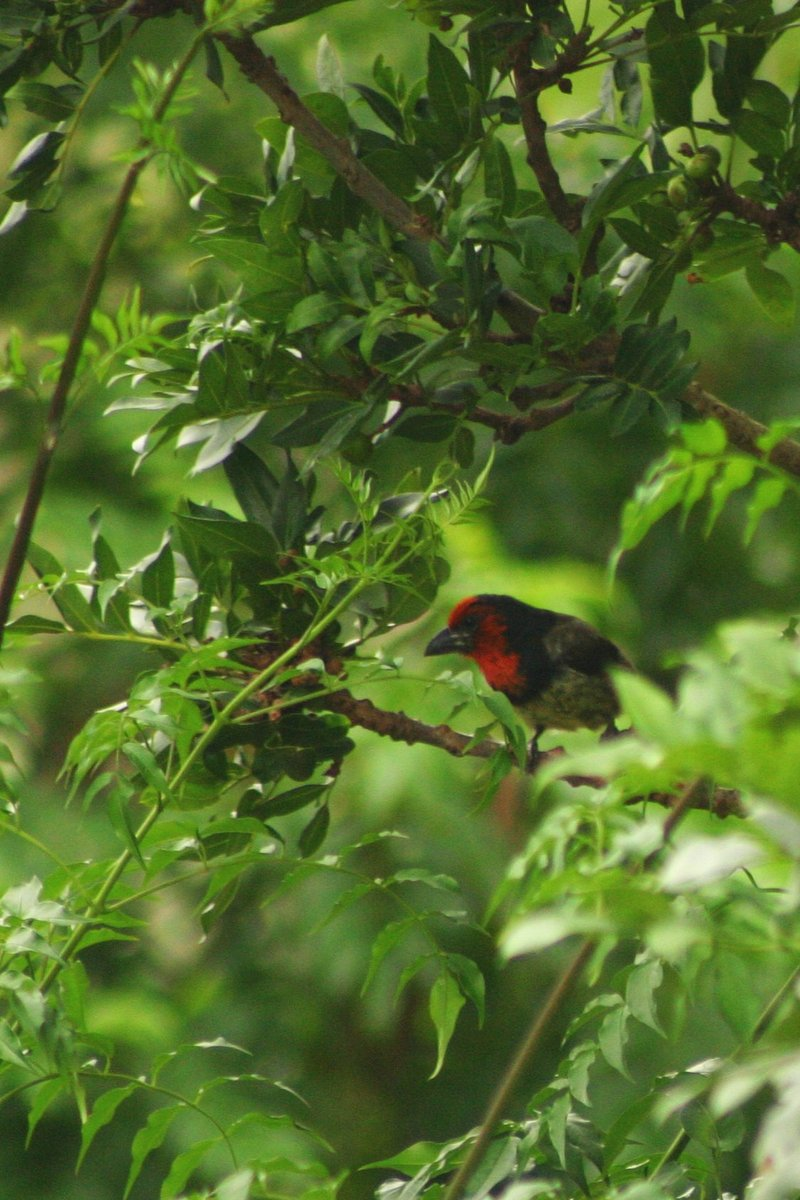
Black-collared barbet, a widespread and common resident

The African barbets are plump birds, with short necks and large heads. They get their name from the bristles which fringe their heavy bills. Most species are brightly coloured.

- Crested barbet, Trachyphonus vaillantii
- White-eared barbet, Stactolaema leucotis
- Whyte's barbet, Stactolaema whytii
- Green barbet, Stactolaema olivacea
- Green tinkerbird, Pogoniulus simplex
- Moustached tinkerbird, Pogoniulus leucomystax
- Yellow-rumped tinkerbird, Pogoniulus bilineatus
- Yellow-fronted tinkerbird, Pogoniulus chrysoconus
- Miombo barbet, Tricholaema frontata
- Black-collared barbet, Lybius torquatus
- Brown-breasted barbet, Lybius melanopterus
- Black-backed barbet, Lybius minor

== Honeyguides ==
Order: Piciformes Family: Indicatoridae

Honeyguides are among the few birds that feed on wax. They are named for the greater honeyguide which leads traditional honey-hunters to bees' nests and, after the hunters have harvested the honey, feeds on the remaining contents of the hive.

- Green-backed honeyguide, Prodotiscus zambesiae
- Wahlberg's honeyguide, Prodotiscus regulus
- Pallid honeyguide, Indicator meliphilus
- Lesser honeyguide, Indicator minor
- Scaly-throated honeyguide, Indicator variegatus
- Greater honeyguide, Indicator indicator

== Woodpeckers ==
Order: Piciformes Family: Picidae

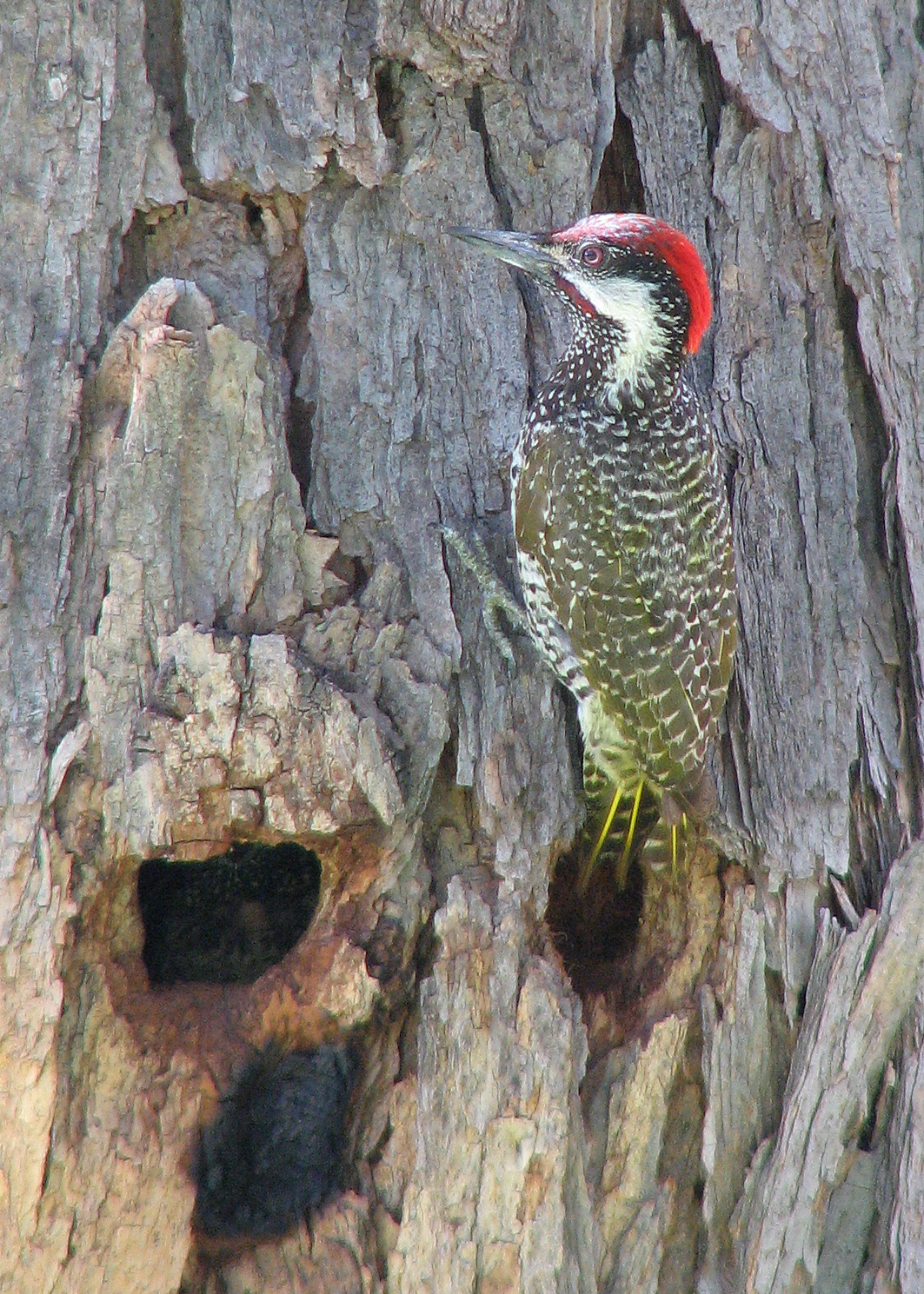
Golden-tailed woodpecker, a widespread resident most common in the south-east

Woodpeckers are small to medium-sized birds with chisel-like beaks, short legs, stiff tails and long tongues used for capturing insects. Some species have feet with two toes pointing forward and two backward, while several species have only three toes. Many woodpeckers have the habit of tapping noisily on tree trunks with their beaks.

- Cardinal woodpecker, Chloropicus fuscescens
- Bearded woodpecker, Chloropicus namaquus
- Stierling's woodpecker, Chloropicus stierlingi
- Olive woodpecker, Chloropicus griseocephalus
- Brown-eared woodpecker, Campethera caroli
- Green-backed woodpecker, Campethera cailliautii
- Bennett's woodpecker, Campethera bennettii
- Reichenow's woodpecker, Campethera scriptoricauda
- Golden-tailed woodpecker, Campethera abingoni

== Falcons ==
Order: Falconiformes Family: Falconidae

Falconidae is a family of diurnal birds of prey. They differ from hawks, eagles and kites in that they kill with their beaks instead of their talons.

- Lesser kestrel, Falco naumanni
- Rock kestrel, Falco rupicolus
- Gray kestrel, Falco ardosiaceus (A)
- Dickinson's kestrel, Falco dickinsoni
- Red-necked falcon, Falco chicquera
- Red-footed falcon, Falco vespertinus
- Amur falcon, Falco amurensis
- Eleonora's falcon, Falco eleonorae
- Sooty falcon, Falco concolor (A)
- Eurasian hobby, Falco subbuteo
- African hobby, Falco cuvierii (A)
- Lanner falcon, Falco biarmicus
- Peregrine falcon, Falco peregrinus
- Taita falcon, Falco fasciinucha

== Old World parrots ==
Order: Psittaciformes Family: Psittaculidae

Characteristic features of parrots include a strong curved bill, an upright stance, strong legs, and clawed zygodactyl feet. Many parrots are vividly colored, and some are multi-colored. In size they range from 8 cm (3.1 in) to 1 m (3.3 ft) in length. Old World parrots are found from Africa east across south and southeast Asia and Oceania to Australia and New Zealand.

- Lilian's lovebird, Agapornis lilianae

== African and New World parrots ==
Order: Psittaciformes Family: Psittacidae

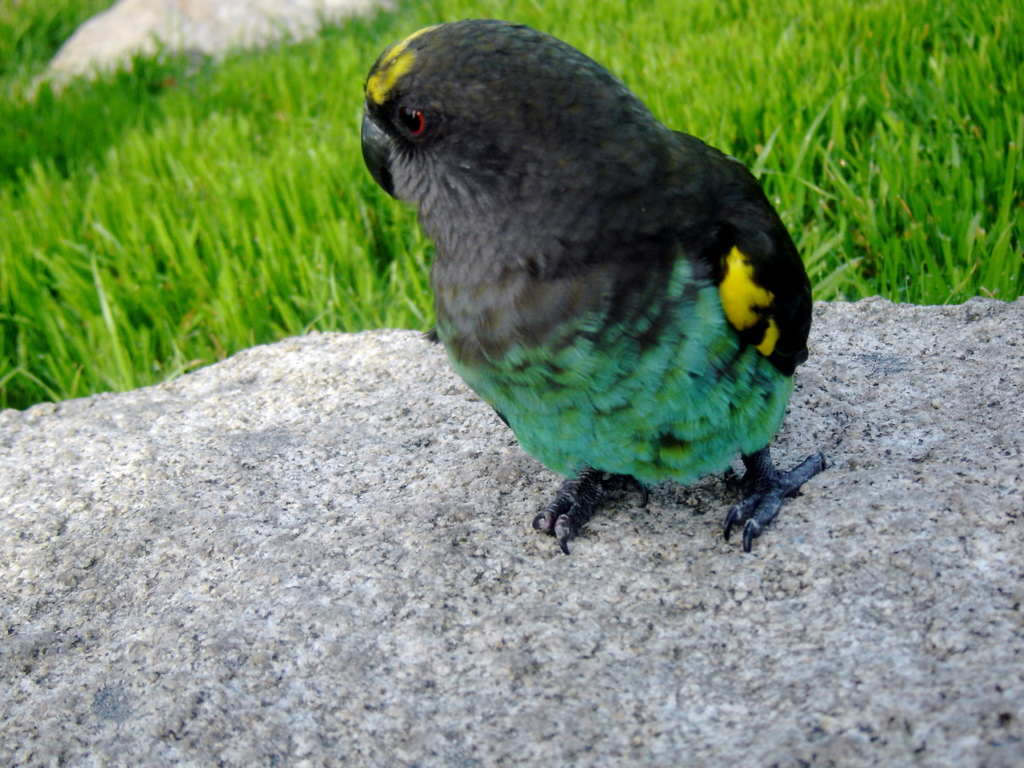
Meyer's parrot, occurs in woodland in northern and central Malawi

Characteristic features of parrots include a strong curved bill, an upright stance, strong legs, and clawed zygodactyl feet. Many parrots are vividly colored, and some are multi-colored. In size they range from 8 cm (3.1 in) to 1 m (3.3 ft) in length. Most of the species in this family are found in the New World.

- Brown-necked parrot, Poicephalus robustus
- Meyer's parrot, Poicephalus meyeri
- Brown-headed parrot, Poicephalus cryptoxanthus

== African and green broadbills ==
Order: Passeriformes Family: Calyptomenidae

The broadbills are small, brightly coloured birds, which feed on fruit and also take insects in flycatcher fashion, snapping their broad bills. Their habitat is canopies of wet forests.

- African broadbill, Smithornis capensis

== Pittas ==
Order: Passeriformes Family: Pittidae

Pittas are medium-sized by passerine standards and are stocky, with fairly long, strong legs, short tails and stout bills. Many are brightly coloured. They spend the majority of their time on wet forest floors, eating snails, insects and similar invertebrates. There are 32 species worldwide and 1 species which occurs in Malawi.

- African pitta, Pitta angolensis

== Cuckooshrikes ==
Order: Passeriformes Family: Campephagidae

The cuckooshrikes are small to medium-sized passerine birds. They are predominantly greyish with white and black, although some species are brightly coloured.

- Gray cuckooshrike, Coracina caesia
- White-breasted cuckooshrike, Coracina pectoralis
- Black cuckooshrike, Campephaga flava

== Old World orioles ==
Order: Passeriformes Family: Oriolidae

The Old World orioles are colourful passerine birds. They are not related to the New World orioles.

- Eurasian golden oriole, Oriolus oriolus
- African golden oriole, Oriolus auratus
- Green-headed oriole, Oriolus chlorocephalus
- African black-headed oriole, Oriolus larvatus

== Wattle-eyes and batises ==
Order: Passeriformes Family: Platysteiridae

The wattle-eyes, or puffback flycatchers, are small stout passerine birds of the African tropics. They get their name from the brightly coloured fleshy eye decorations found in most species in this group.

- Black-throated wattle-eye, Platysteira peltata
- Short-tailed batis, Batis mixta
- Dark batis, Batis crypta (E)
- Malawi batis, Batis dimorpha
- Woodward's batis, Batis fratrum
- Chinspot batis, Batis molitor
- Pale batis, Batis soror

== Vangas, helmetshrikes, and allies ==
Order: Passeriformes Family: Vangidae

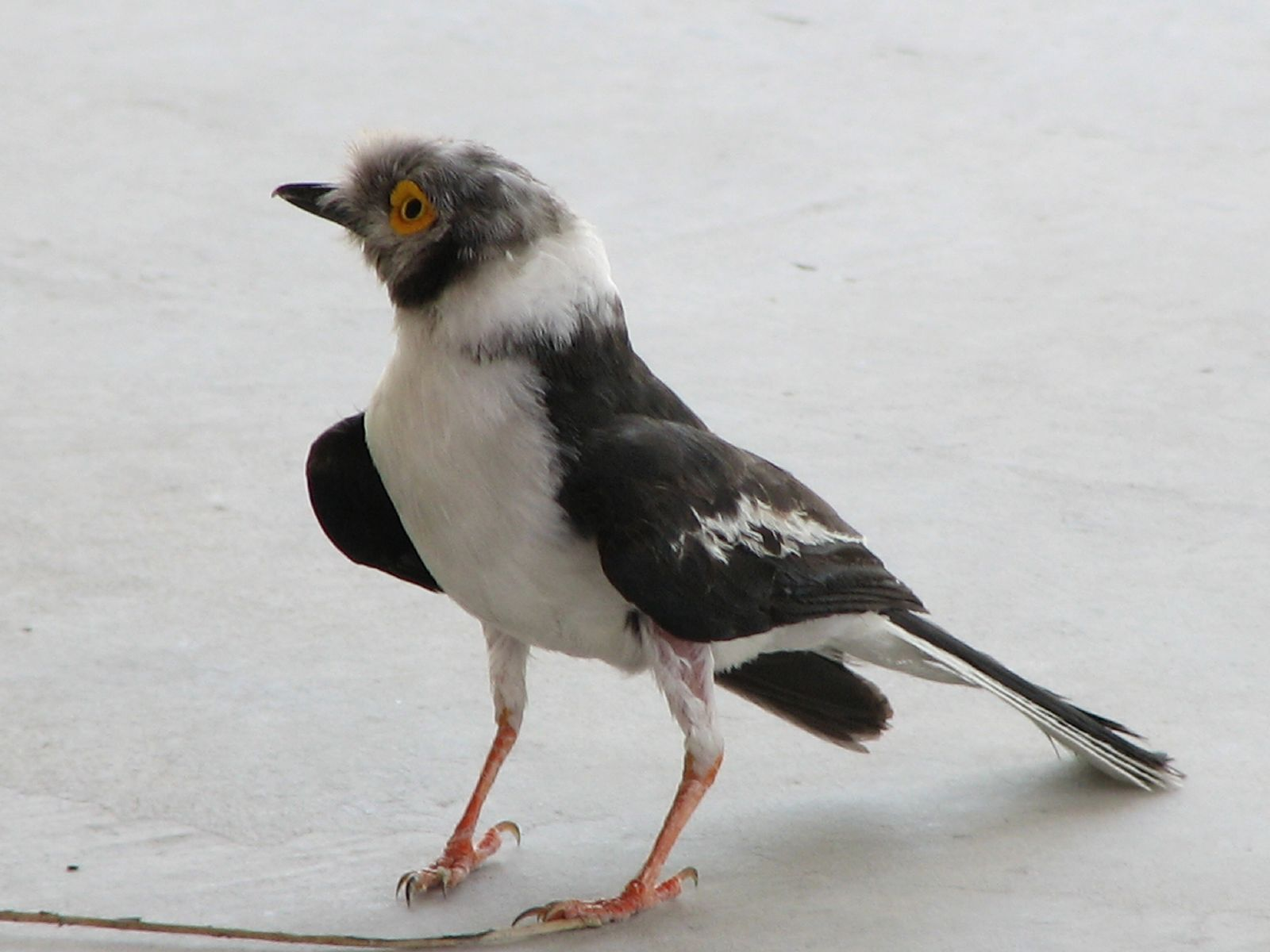
White helmetshrike, a gregarious bird of woodland

The helmetshrikes are similar in build to the shrikes, but tend to be colourful species with distinctive crests or other head ornaments, such as wattles, from which they get their name.

- White helmetshrike, Prionops plumatus
- Retz's helmetshrike, Prionops retzii
- Chestnut-fronted helmetshrike, Prionops scopifrons
- Black-and-white shrike-flycatcher, Bias musicus

== Bushshrikes and allies ==
Order: Passeriformes Family: Malaconotidae

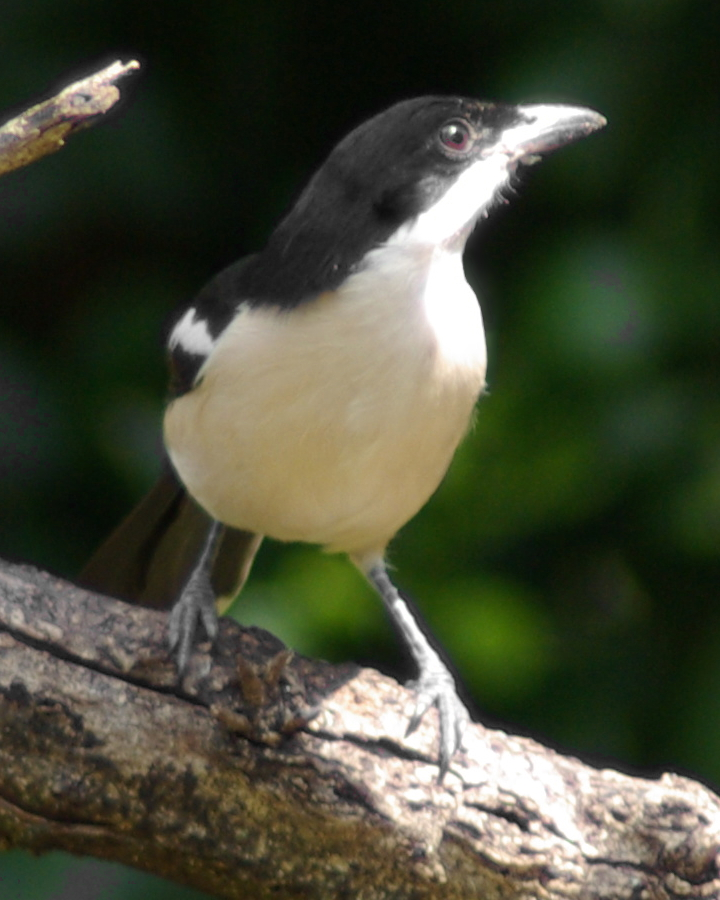
Tropical boubou, a very common resident

Bushshrikes are similar in habits to shrikes, hunting insects and other small prey from a perch on a bush. Although similar in build to the shrikes, these tend to be either colourful species or largely black; some species are quite secretive.

- Brubru, Nilaus afer
- Black-backed puffback, Dryoscopus cubla
- Marsh tchagra, Tchagra minuta
- Black-crowned tchagra, Tchagra senegala
- Brown-crowned tchagra, Tchagra australis
- Tropical boubou, Laniarius major
- Southern boubou, Laniarius ferrugineus
- Fülleborn's boubou, Laniarius fuelleborni
- Sulphur-breasted bushshrike, Telophorus sulfureopectus
- Olive bushshrike, Telophorus olivaceus
- Black-fronted bushshrike, Telophorus nigrifrons
- Four-colored bushshrike, Telophorus viridis
- Gray-headed bushshrike, Malaconotus blanchoti

== Drongos ==
Order: Passeriformes Family: Dicruridae

The drongos are mostly black or dark grey in colour, sometimes with metallic tints. They have long forked tails, and some Asian species have elaborate tail decorations. They have short legs and sit very upright when perched, like a shrike. They flycatch or take prey from the ground.

- Common square-tailed drongo, Dicrurus ludwigii
- Fork-tailed drongo, Dicrurus adsimilis

== Monarch flycatchers ==
Order: Passeriformes Family: Monarchidae

The monarch flycatchers are small to medium-sized insectivorous passerines which hunt by flycatching.

- African crested-flycatcher, Trochocercus cyanomelas
- African paradise-flycatcher, Terpsiphone viridis

== Shrikes ==
Order: Passeriformes Family: Laniidae

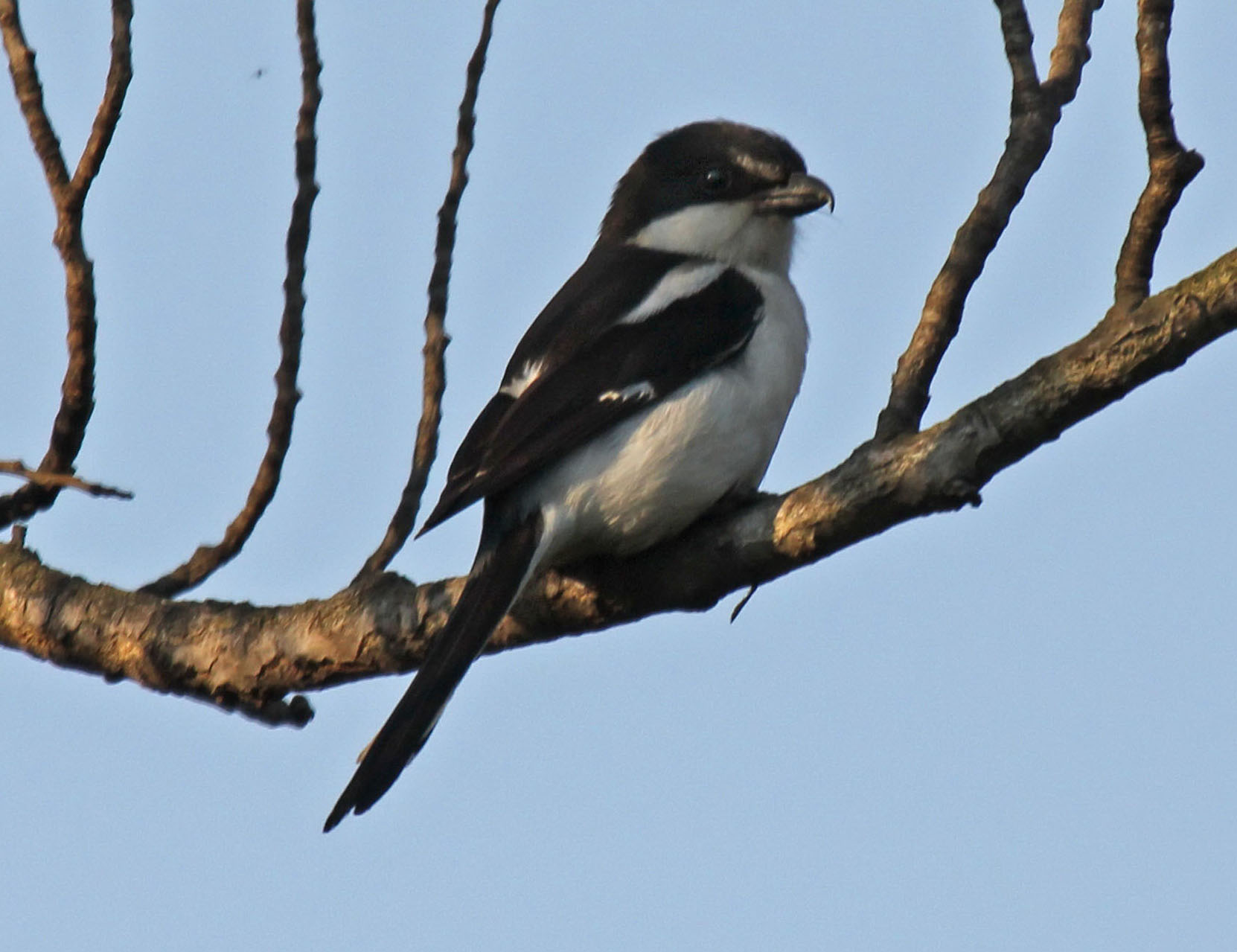
Southern fiscal, conspicuous in open country

Shrikes are passerine birds known for their habit of catching other birds and small animals and impaling the uneaten portions of their bodies on thorns. A typical shrike's beak is hooked, like a bird of prey.

- Red-backed shrike, Lanius collurio
- Red-tailed shrike, Lanius phoenicuroides (A)
- Lesser gray shrike, Lanius minor
- Magpie shrike, Lanius melanoleucus
- Northern fiscal, Lanius humeralis
- Southern fiscal, Lanius collaris
- Souza's shrike, Lanius souzae

== Crows, jays, and magpies ==
Order: Passeriformes Family: Corvidae

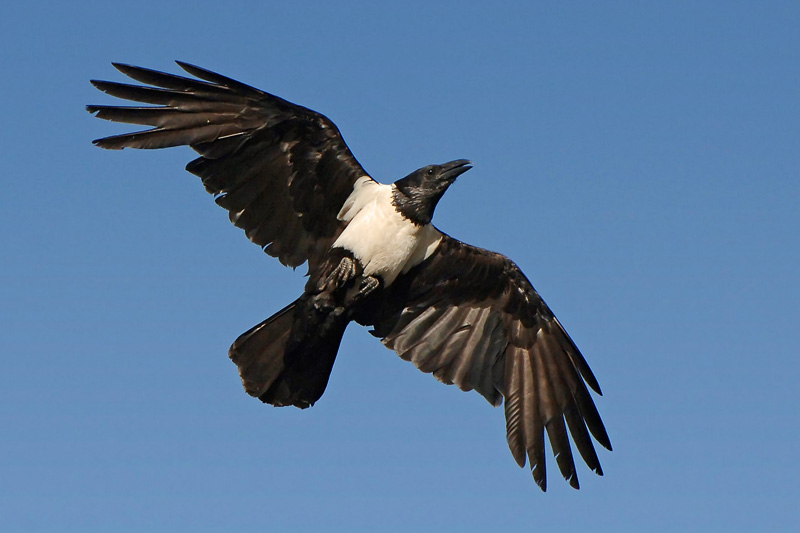
Pied crow, has adapted well to man-made habitats

The family Corvidae includes crows, ravens, jays, choughs, magpies, treepies, nutcrackers and ground jays. Corvids are above average in size among the Passeriformes, and some of the larger species show high levels of intelligence.

- Pied crow, Corvus albus
- White-necked raven, Corvus albicollis

== Hyliotas ==
Order: Passeriformes Family: Hyliotidae

The members of this small family, all of genus Hyliota, are birds of the forest canopy. They tend to feed in mixed-species flocks.

- Yellow-bellied hyliota, Hyliota flavigaster
- Southern hyliota, Hyliota australis

== Fairy flycatchers ==
Order: Passeriformes Family: Stenostiridae

Most of the species of this small family are found in Africa, though a few inhabit tropical Asia. They are not closely related to other birds called "flycatchers".

- African blue flycatcher, Elminia longicauda
- White-tailed blue flycatcher, Elminia albicauda
- White-tailed crested-flycatcher, Elminia albonotata

== Tits, chickadees, and titmice ==
Order: Passeriformes Family: Paridae

The Paridae are mainly small stocky woodland species with short stout bills. Some have crests. They are adaptable birds, with a mixed diet including seeds and insects.

- White-winged black-tit, Melaniparus leucomelas
- Rufous-bellied tit, Melaniparus rufiventris
- Southern black-tit, Melaniparus niger
- Carp's tit, Melaniparus carpi (A)
- Miombo tit, Melaniparus griseiventris

== Penduline-tits ==
Order: Passeriformes Family: Remizidae

The penduline tits are a group of small passerine birds related to the true tits. They are insectivores.

- African penduline-tit, Anthoscopus caroli

== Larks ==
Order: Passeriformes Family: Alaudidae

Larks are small terrestrial birds with often extravagant songs and display flights. Most larks are fairly dull in appearance. Their food is insects and seeds.

- Dusky lark, Pinarocorys nigricans (A)
- Chestnut-backed sparrow-lark, Eremopterix leucotis
- Fischer's sparrow-lark, Eremopterix leucopareia
- Rufous-naped lark, Mirafra africana
- Flappet lark, Mirafra rufocinnamomea
- Red-capped lark, Calandrella cinerea

== Nicators ==
Order: Passeriformes Family: Nicatoridae

The nicators are shrike-like, with hooked bills. They are endemic to sub-Saharan Africa.

- Eastern nicator, Nicator gularis

== African warblers ==
Order: Passeriformes Family: Macrosphenidae

African warblers are small to medium-sized insectivores which are found in a wide variety of habitats south of the Sahara.

- Red-capped crombec, Sylvietta ruficapilla
- Red-faced crombec, Sylvietta whytii
- Cape crombec, Sylvietta rufescens
- Moustached grass-warbler, Melocichla mentalis

== Cisticolas and allies ==
Order: Passeriformes Family: Cisticolidae

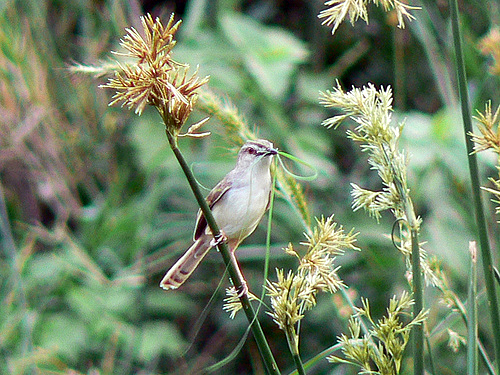
Tawny-flanked prinia, a very common and widespread resident

The Cisticolidae are warblers found mainly in warmer southern regions of the Old World. They are generally very small birds of drab brown or grey appearance found in open country such as grassland or scrub.

- Yellow-bellied eremomela, Eremomela icteropygialis
- Greencap eremomela, Eremomela scotops
- Burnt-neck eremomela, Eremomela usticollis
- Long-billed tailorbird, Artisornis moreaui
- Miombo wren-warbler, Calamonastes undosus
- Stierling's wren-warbler, Calamonastes stierlingi
- Green-backed camaroptera, Camaroptera brachyura
- Bar-throated apalis, Apalis thoracica
- Yellow-throated apalis, Apalis flavigularis
- White-winged apalis, Apalis chariessa
- Yellow-breasted apalis, Apalis flavida
- Rudd's apalis, Apalis ruddi
- Chestnut-throated apalis, Apalis porphyrolaema
- Chapin's apalis, Apalis chapini
- Black-headed apalis, Apalis melanocephala
- Brown-headed apalis, Apalis alticola
- Tawny-flanked prinia, Prinia subflava
- Red-winged prinia, Prinia erythroptera
- Red-faced cisticola, Cisticola erythrops
- Singing cisticola, Cisticola cantans
- Trilling cisticola, Cisticola woosnami
- Hunter's cisticola, Cisticola hunteri
- Black-lored cisticola, Cisticola nigriloris
- Rock-loving cisticola, Cisticola aberrans
- Rattling cisticola, Cisticola chiniana
- Tinkling cisticola, Cisticola rufilatus
- Wailing cisticola, Cisticola lais
- Churring cisticola, Cisticola njombe
- Winding cisticola, Cisticola marginatus
- Rufous-winged cisticola, Cisticola galactotes
- Levaillant's cisticola, Cisticola tinniens
- Croaking cisticola, Cisticola natalensis
- Piping cisticola, Cisticola fulvicapillus
- Siffling cisticola, Cisticola brachypterus
- Zitting cisticola, Cisticola juncidis
- Wing-snapping cisticola, Cisticola ayresii

== Reed warblers and allies ==
Order: Passeriformes Family: Acrocephalidae

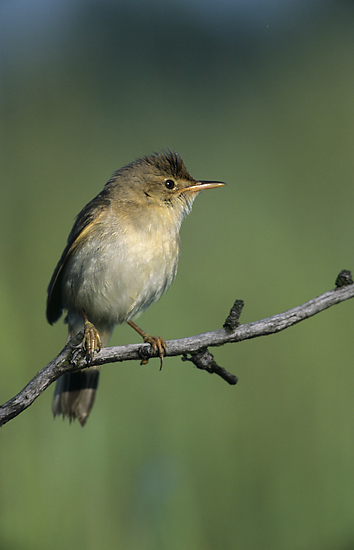
Marsh warbler, large numbers winter in the Lower Shire Valley

The members of this family are usually rather large for "warblers". Most are rather plain olivaceous brown above with much yellow to beige below. They are usually found in open woodland, reedbeds, or tall grass. The family occurs mostly in southern to western Eurasia and surroundings, but it also ranges far into the Pacific, with some species in Africa.

- African yellow-warbler, Iduna natalensis
- Mountain yellow-warbler, Iduna similis
- Olive-tree warbler, Hippolais olivetorum
- Icterine warbler, Hippolais icterina
- Sedge warbler, Acrocephalus schoenobaenus
- Marsh warbler, Acrocephalus palustris
- Common reed warbler, Acrocephalus scirpaceus
- Basra reed warbler, Acrocephalus griseldis
- Lesser swamp warbler, Acrocephalus gracilirostris
- Great reed warbler, Acrocephalus arundinaceus

== Grassbirds and allies ==
Order: Passeriformes Family: Locustellidae

Locustellidae are a family of small insectivorous songbirds found mainly in Eurasia, Africa, and the Australian region. They are smallish birds with tails that are usually long and pointed, and tend to be drab brownish or buffy all over.

- River warbler, Locustella fluviatilis
- Fan-tailed grassbird, Catriscus brevirostris
- Evergreen-forest warbler, Bradypterus lopezi
- Cinnamon bracken-warbler, Bradypterus cinnamomeus
- Little rush-warbler, Bradypterus baboecala

== Swallows ==
Order: Passeriformes Family: Hirundinidae

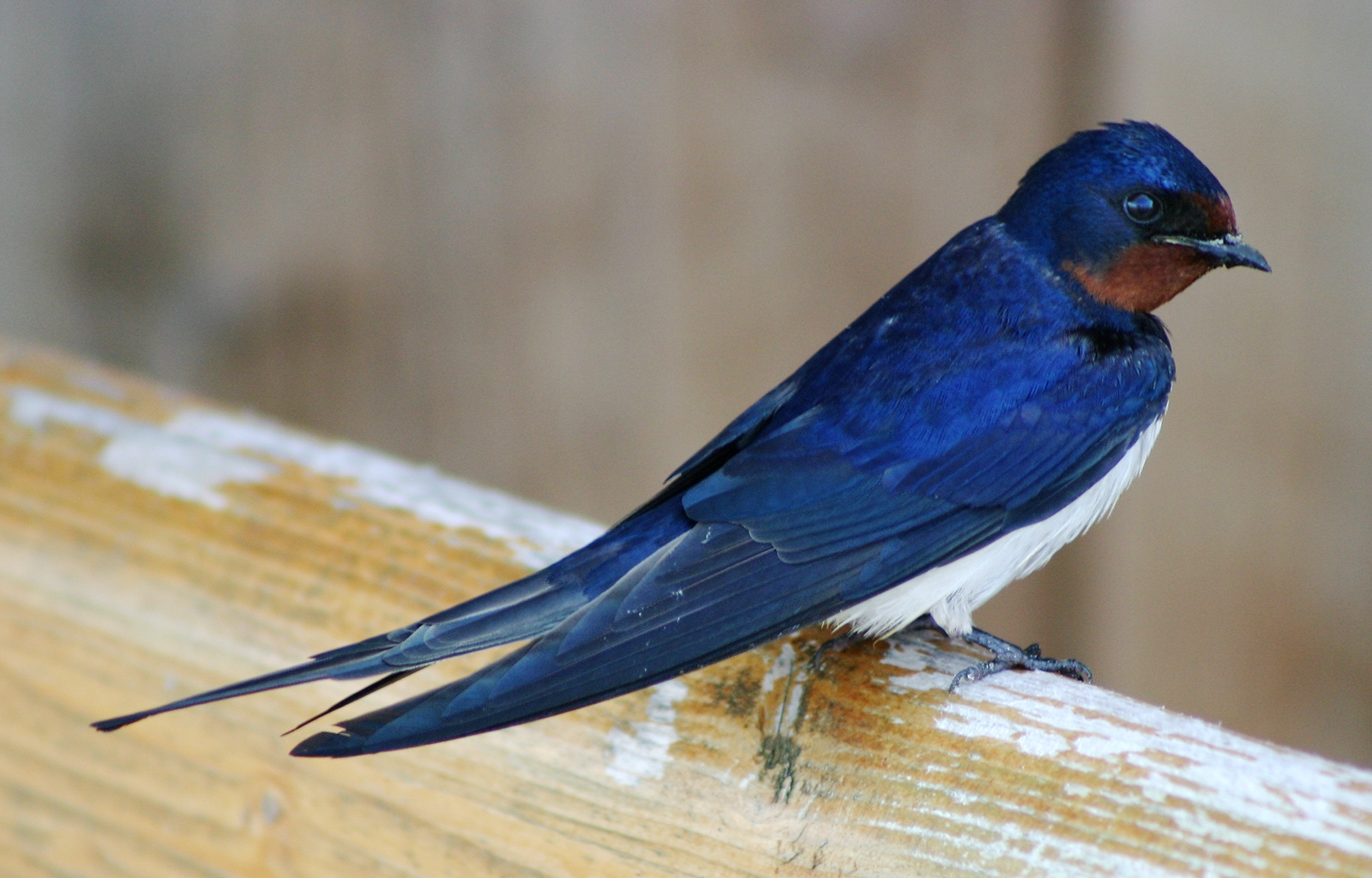
Barn swallow, large numbers migrate to Malawi from the Northern Hemisphere

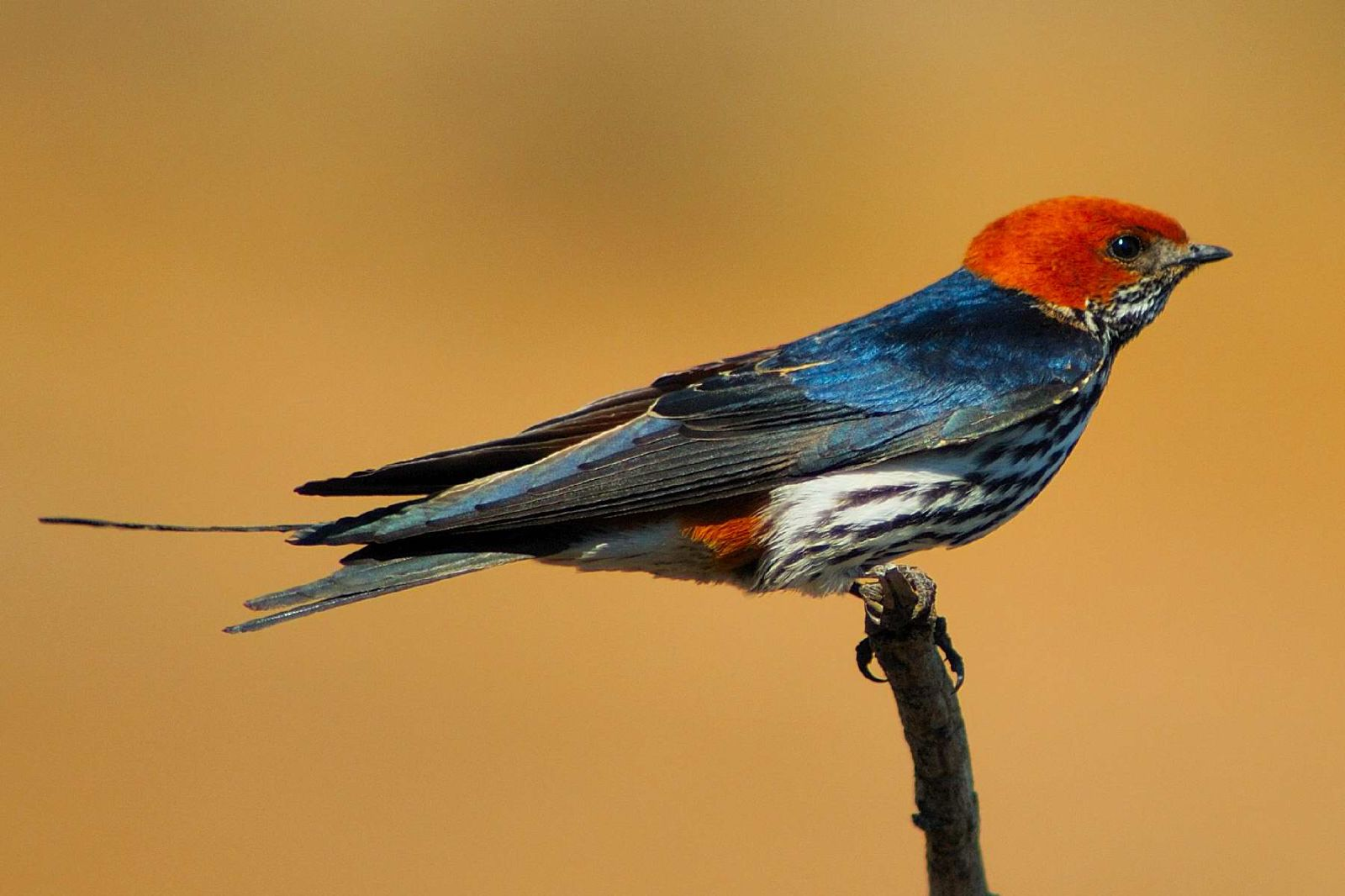
Lesser striped swallow, a common bird which has adapted to urban areas

The family Hirundinidae is adapted to aerial feeding. They have a slender streamlined body, long pointed wings and a short bill with a wide gape. The feet are adapted to perching rather than walking, and the front toes are partially joined at the base.

- Plain martin, Riparia paludicola
- Bank swallow, Riparia riparia
- Banded martin, Neophedina cincta
- Mascarene martin, Phedina borbonica
- Rock martin, Ptyonoprogne fuligula
- Barn swallow, Hirundo rustica
- Angola swallow, Hirundo angolensis
- White-throated swallow, Hirundo albigularis
- Wire-tailed swallow, Hirundo smithii
- Pearl-breasted swallow, Hirundo dimidiata
- Montane blue swallow, Hirundo atrocaerulea
- Greater striped swallow, Cecropis cucullata (A)
- Red-rumped swallow, Cecropis daurica
- Lesser striped swallow, Cecropis abyssinica
- Rufous-chested swallow, Cecropis semirufa
- Mosque swallow, Cecropis senegalensis
- South African swallow, Petrochelidon spilodera (A)
- Common house-martin, Delichon urbicum
- White-headed sawwing, Psalidoprocne albiceps
- Black sawwing, Psalidoprocne pristoptera
- Gray-rumped swallow, Pseudhirundo griseopyga

== Bulbuls ==
Order: Passeriformes Family: Pycnonotidae

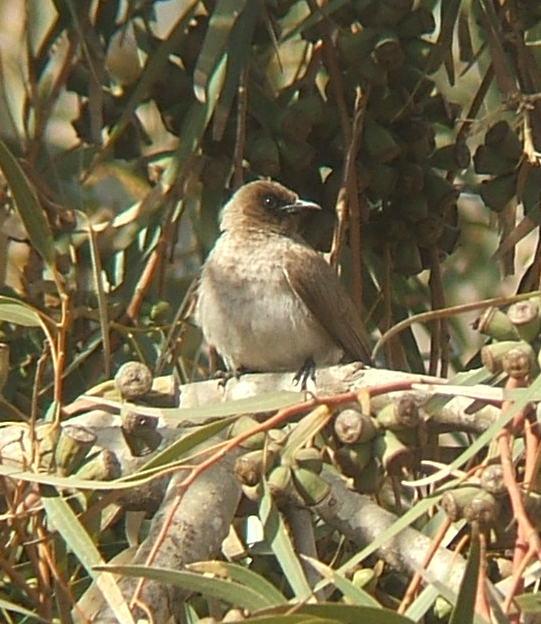
Common bulbul, one of Malawi's most common birds

Bulbuls are medium-sized songbirds. Some are colourful with yellow, red or orange vents, cheeks, throats or supercilia, but most are drab, with uniform olive-brown to black plumage. Some species have distinct crests. The Chichewa name for a bulbul is pumbwa.

- Sombre greenbul, Andropadus importunus
- Shelley's greenbul, Arizelocichla masukuensis
- Eastern mountain greenbul, Arizelocichla nigriceps
- Black-browed mountain greenbul, Arizelocichla fusciceps
- Stripe-cheeked greenbul, Arizelocichla milanjensis
- Yellow-bellied greenbul, Chlorocichla flaviventris
- Yellow-throated greenbul, Atimastillas flavicollis
- Little greenbul, Eurillas virens
- Terrestrial brownbul, Phyllastrephus terrestris
- Gray-olive greenbul, Phyllastrephus cerviniventris
- Cabanis's greenbul, Phyllastrephus cabanisi
- Yellow-streaked bulbul, Phyllastrephus flavostriatus
- Common bulbul, Pycnonotus barbatus

== Leaf warblers ==
Order: Passeriformes Family: Phylloscopidae

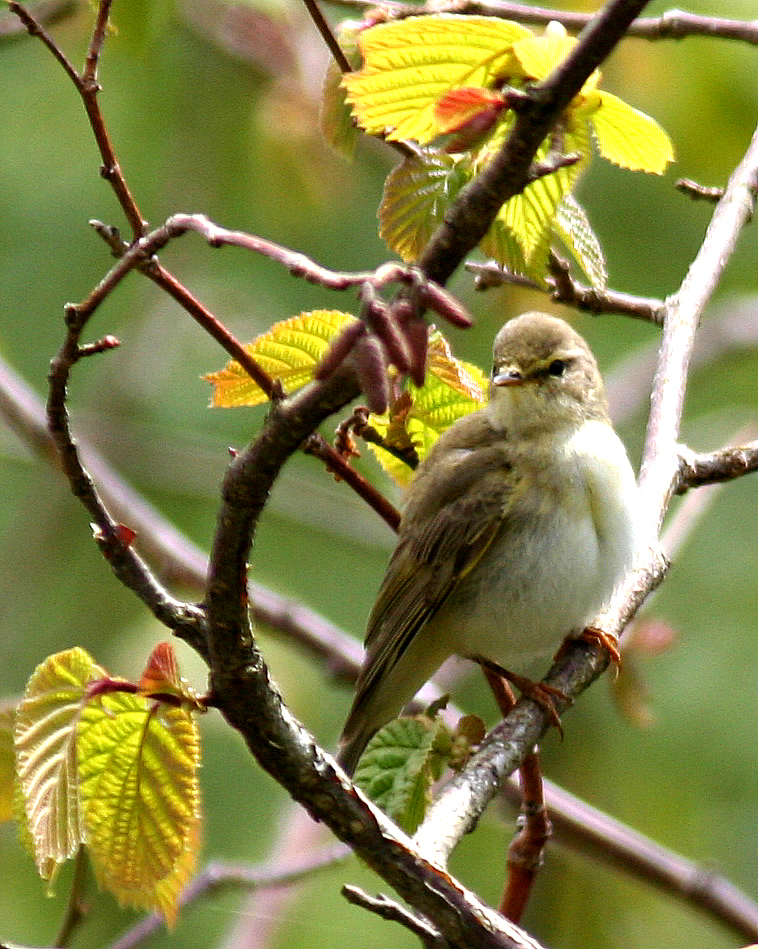
Willow warbler, a common migrant from Eurasia

Leaf warblers are a family of small insectivorous birds found mostly in Eurasia and ranging into Wallacea and Africa. The species are of various sizes, often green-plumaged above and yellow below, or more subdued with grayish-green to grayish-brown colors.

- Willow warbler, Phylloscopus trochilus
- Yellow-throated woodland-warbler, Phylloscopus ruficapilla

== Bush warblers and allies ==
Order: Passeriformes Family: Scotocercidae

The members of this family are found throughout Africa, Asia, and Polynesia. Their taxonomy is in flux, and some authorities place genus Erythrocerus in another family.

- Livingstone's flycatcher, Erythrocercus livingstonei

== Sylviid warblers, parrotbills, and allies ==
Order: Passeriformes Family: Sylviidae The family Sylviidae is a group of small insectivorous passerine birds. They mainly occur as breeding species, as the common name implies, in Europe, Asia and, to a lesser extent, Africa. Most are of generally undistinguished appearance, but many have distinctive songs.

- Eurasian blackcap, Sylvia atricapilla
- Garden warbler, Sylvia borin
- African hill babbler, Sylvia abyssinica
- Barred warbler, Curruca nisoria (A)
- Brown parisoma, Curruca lugens
- Greater whitethroat, Curruca communis

== White-eyes, yuhinas, and allies ==
Order: Passeriformes Family: Zosteropidae

The white-eyes are small and mostly undistinguished, their plumage above being generally some dull colour like greenish-olive, but some species have a white or bright yellow throat, breast or lower parts, and several have buff flanks. As their name suggests, many species have a white ring around each eye.

- Southern yellow white-eye, Zosterops anderssoni

== Ground babblers and allies ==
Order: Passeriformes Family: Pellorneidae

These small to medium-sized songbirds have soft fluffy plumage but are otherwise rather diverse. Members of the genus Illadopsis are found in forests, but some other genera are birds of scrublands.

- Mountain illadopsis, Illadopsis pyrrhoptera

== Laughingthrushes and allies ==
Order: Passeriformes Family: Leiothrichidae

The members of this family are diverse in size and coloration, though those of genus Turdoides tend to be brown or grayish. The family is found in Africa, India, and southeast Asia.

- Arrow-marked babbler, Turdoides jardineii

== Treecreepers ==
Order: Passeriformes Family: Certhiidae

Treecreepers are small woodland birds, brown above and white below. They have thin pointed down-curved bills, which they use to extricate insects from bark. They have stiff tail feathers, like woodpeckers, which they use to support themselves on vertical trees.

- African spotted creeper, Salpornis salvadori

== Oxpeckers ==
Order: Passeriformes Family: Buphagidae

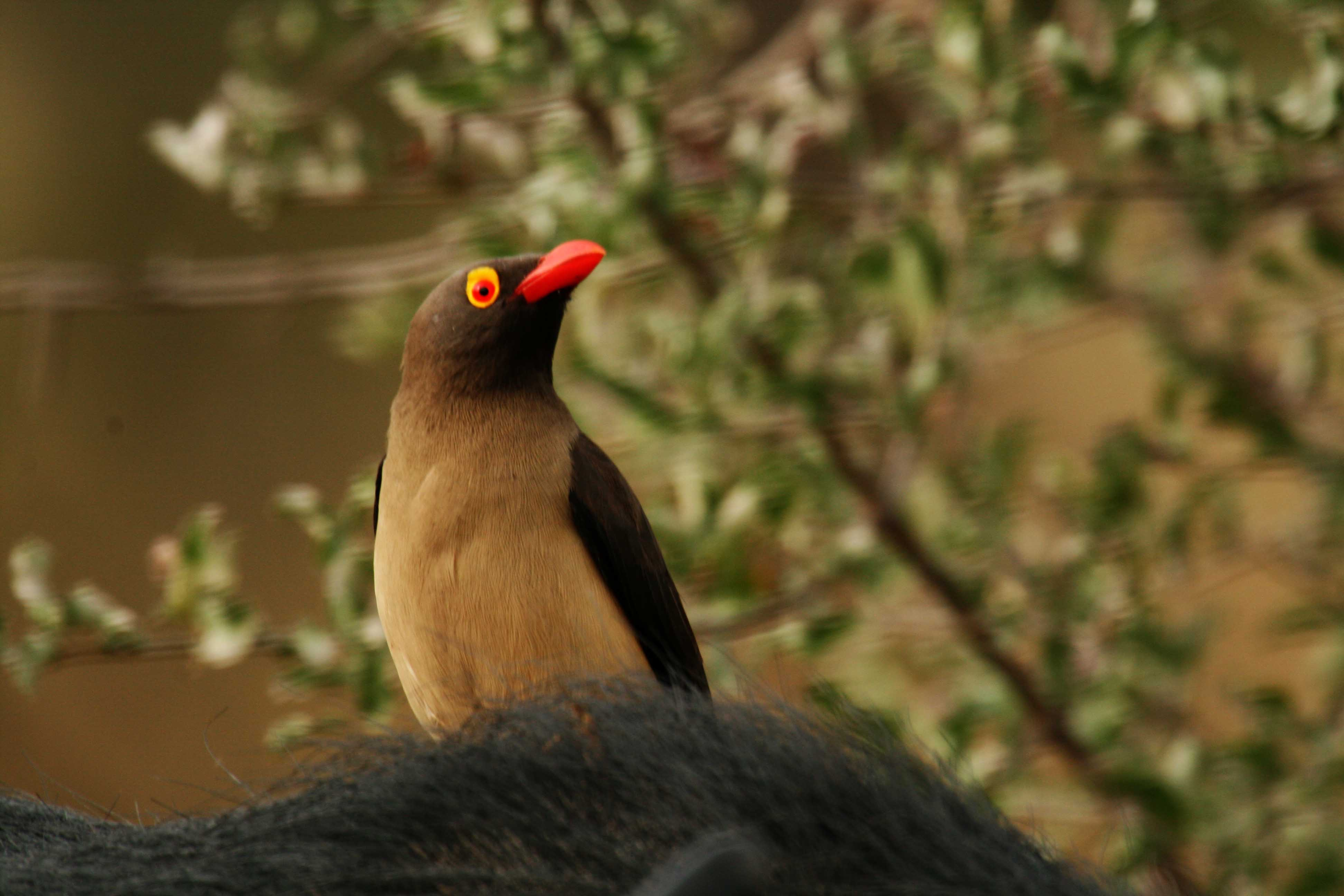
Red-billed oxpecker, mainly found in national parks and nature reserves where there are populations of large wild mammals

As both the English and scientific names of these birds imply, they feed on ectoparasites, primarily ticks, found on large mammals.

- Red-billed oxpecker, Buphagus erythrorhynchus
- Yellow-billed oxpecker, Buphagus africanus

== Starlings ==
Order: Passeriformes Family: Sturnidae

Starlings are small to medium-sized passerine birds. Their flight is strong and direct and they are very gregarious. Their preferred habitat is fairly open country. They eat insects and fruit. Plumage is typically dark with a metallic sheen.

- Wattled starling, Creatophora cinerea
- Violet-backed starling, Cinnyricinclus leucogaster
- Slender-billed starling, Onychognathus tenuirostris
- Red-winged starling, Onychognathus morio
- Waller's starling, Onychognathus walleri
- Babbling starling, Neocichla gutturalis
- Sharpe's starling, Pholia sharpii (A)
- Meves's starling, Lamprotornis mevesii
- Lesser blue-eared starling, Lamprotornis chloropterus
- Greater blue-eared starling, Lamprotornis chalybaeus

== Thrushes and allies ==
Order: Passeriformes Family: Turdidae

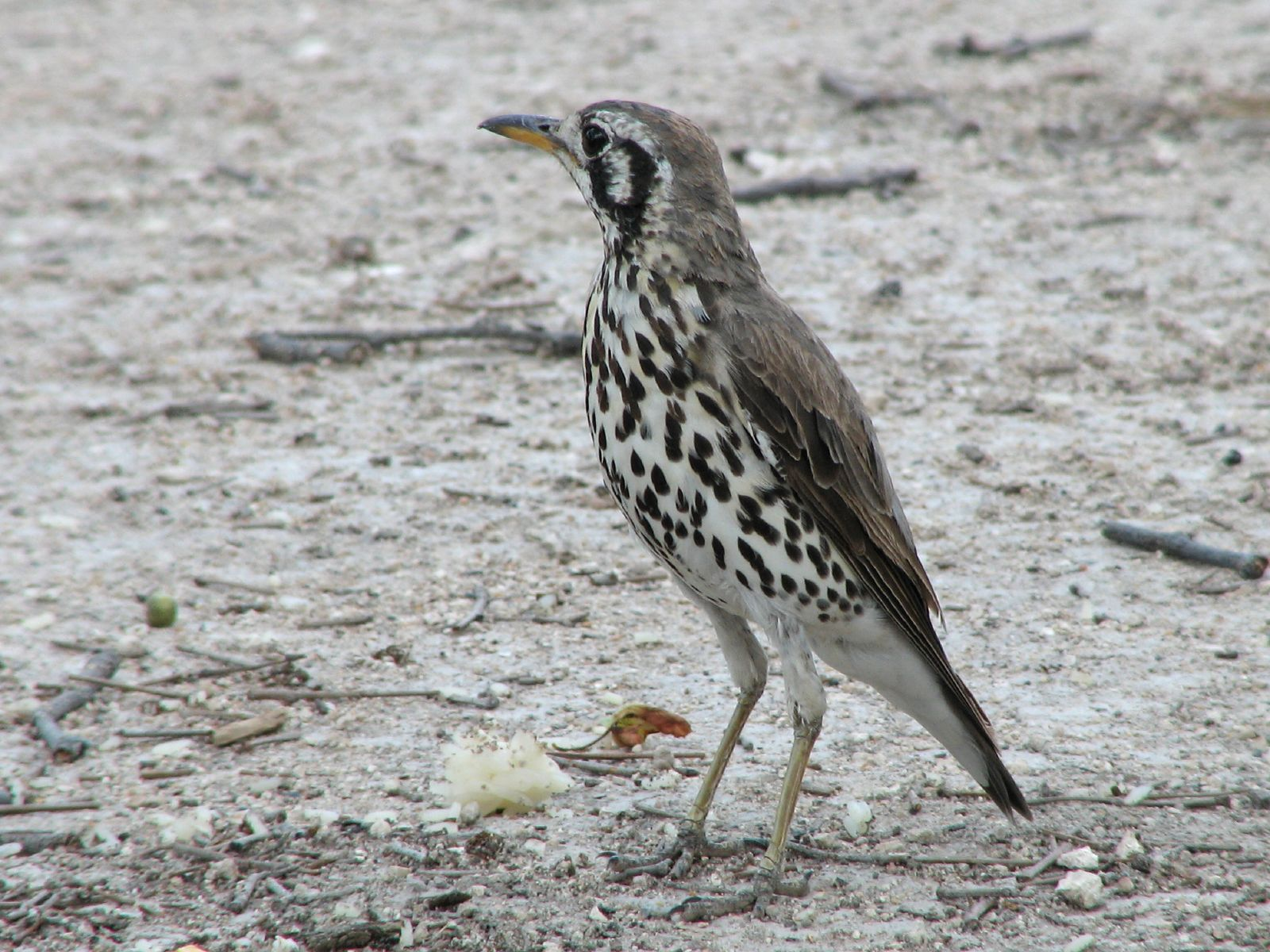
Groundscraper thrush, small numbers occur in open woodland, gardens and golf courses

The thrushes are a group of passerine birds that occur mainly in the Old World. They are plump, soft plumaged, small to medium-sized insectivores or sometimes omnivores, often feeding on the ground. Many have attractive songs.

- Spotted ground-thrush, Geokichla guttata
- Orange ground-thrush, Geokichla gurneyi
- Groundscraper thrush, Turdus litsitsirupa
- Abyssinian thrush, Turdus abyssinicus
- Kurrichane thrush, Turdus libonyana
- Olive thrush, Turdus olivaceus

== Old World flycatchers ==
Order: Passeriformes Family: Muscicapidae

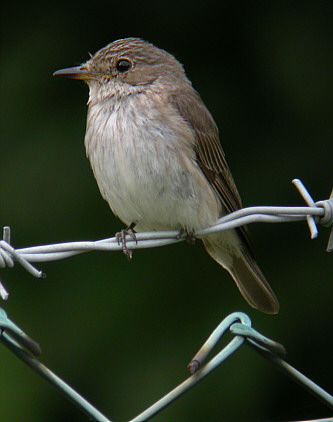
Spotted flycatcher, a common and widespread migrant

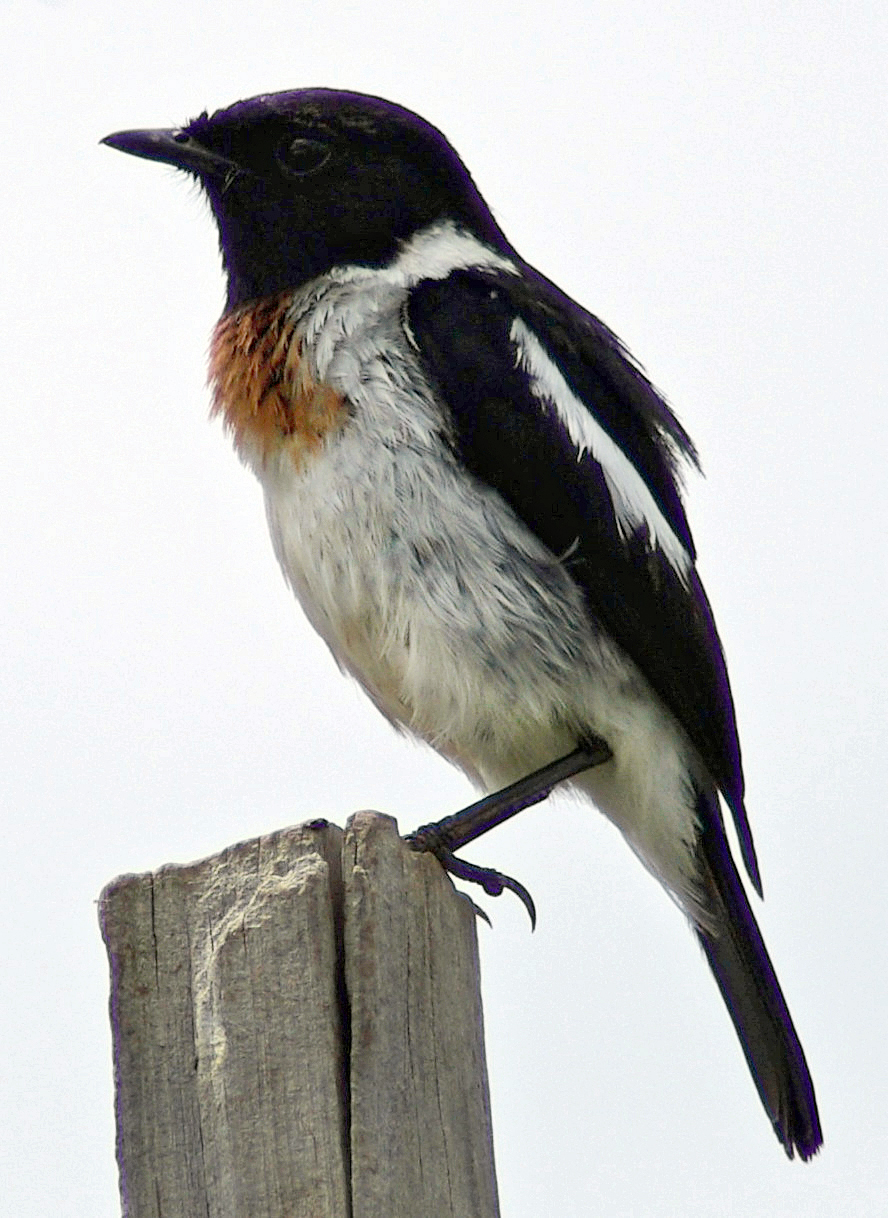
African stonechat, most common in highland areas

Old World flycatchers and chats are a large group of small passerine birds native to the Old World. They are mainly small insectivores. The appearance of these birds is highly varied, but they mostly have weak songs and harsh calls.

- African dusky flycatcher, Muscicapa adusta
- Spotted flycatcher, Muscicapa striata
- Böhm's flycatcher, Bradornis boehmi
- Pale flycatcher, Agricola pallidus
- Gray tit-flycatcher, Fraseria plumbea
- Ashy flycatcher, Fraseria caerulescens
- Southern black-flycatcher, Melaenornis pammelaina
- White-eyed slaty-flycatcher, Melaenornis fischeri
- Bearded scrub-robin, Cercotrichas quadrivirgata
- Miombo scrub-robin, Cercotrichas barbata
- Rufous-tailed scrub-robin, Cercotrichas galactotes (A)
- Red-backed scrub-robin, Cercotrichas leucophrys
- Olive-flanked robin-chat, Cossypha anomala
- Cape robin-chat, Cossypha caffra
- White-browed robin-chat, Cossypha heuglini
- Red-capped robin-chat, Cossypha natalensis
- Collared palm-thrush, Cichladusa arquata
- White-starred robin, Pogonocichla stellata
- Cholo alethe, Chamaetylas choloensis
- White-chested alethe, Chamaetylas fuelleborni
- Sharpe's akalat, Sheppardia sharpei
- East coast akalat, Sheppardia gunningi
- Thrush nightingale, Luscinia luscinia
- Collared flycatcher, Ficedula albicollis
- Miombo rock-thrush, Monticola angolensis
- Whinchat, Saxicola rubetra
- African stonechat, Saxicola torquatus
- Mocking cliff-chat, Thamnolaea cinnamomeiventris
- Arnot's chat, Myrmecocichla arnotti
- Northern wheatear, Oenanthe oenanthe
- Capped wheatear, Oenanthe pileata
- Familiar chat, Oenanthe familiaris
- Boulder chat, Pinarornis plumosus

== Dapple-throat and allies ==
Order: Passeriformes Family: Modulatricidae

This species and two others, all of different genera, were formerly placed in family Promeropidae, the sugarbirds, but were accorded their own family in 2017.

- Spot-throat, Modulatrix stictigula

== Sunbirds and spiderhunters ==
Order: Passeriformes Family: Nectariniidae

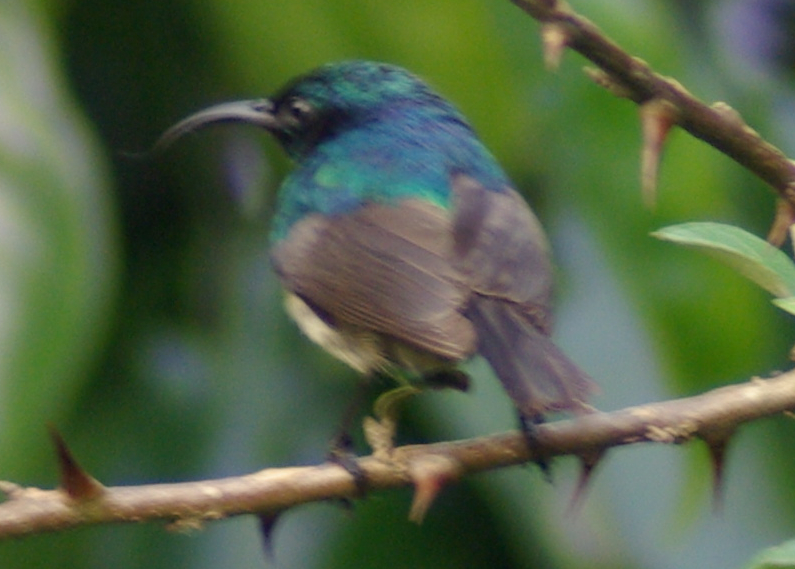
Eastern double-collared sunbird, very common in mountain rainforest

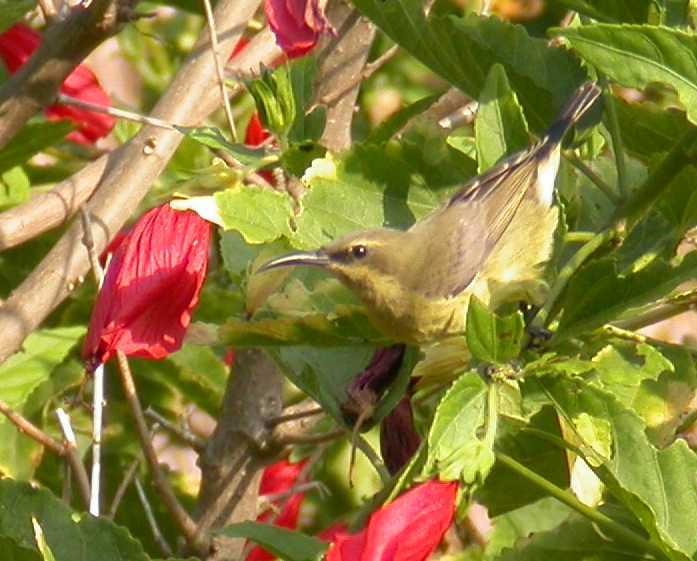
Copper sunbird, many move down to lowland regions outside the breeding season

The sunbirds and spiderhunters are very small passerine birds which feed largely on nectar, although they will also take insects, especially when feeding young. Flight is fast and direct on their short wings. Most species can take nectar by hovering like a hummingbird, but usually perch to feed.

- Anchieta's sunbird, Anthreptes anchietae
- Western violet-backed sunbird, Anthreptes longuemarei
- Collared sunbird, Hedydipna collaris
- Green-headed sunbird, Cyanomitra verticalis
- Olive sunbird, Cyanomitra olivacea
- Mouse-colored sunbird, Cyanomitra veroxii
- Amethyst sunbird, Chalcomitra amethystina
- Scarlet-chested sunbird, Chalcomitra senegalensis
- Bronze sunbird, Nectarinia kilimensis
- Malachite sunbird, Nectarinia famosa
- Red-tufted sunbird, Nectarinia johnstoni
- Western miombo sunbird, Cinnyris gertrudis
- Eastern miombo sunbird, Cinnyris manoensis
- Stuhlmann's sunbird, Cinnyris stuhlmanni
- Montane double-collared sunbird, Cinnyris ludovicensis
- Forest double-collared sunbird, Cinnyris fuelleborni
- Shelley's sunbird, Cinnyris shelleyi
- Purple-banded sunbird, Cinnyris bifasciatus
- Oustalet's sunbird, Cinnyris oustaleti
- White-breasted sunbird, Cinnyris talatala
- Variable sunbird, Cinnyris venustus
- Copper sunbird, Cinnyris cupreus

== Weavers and allies ==
Order: Passeriformes Family: Ploceidae

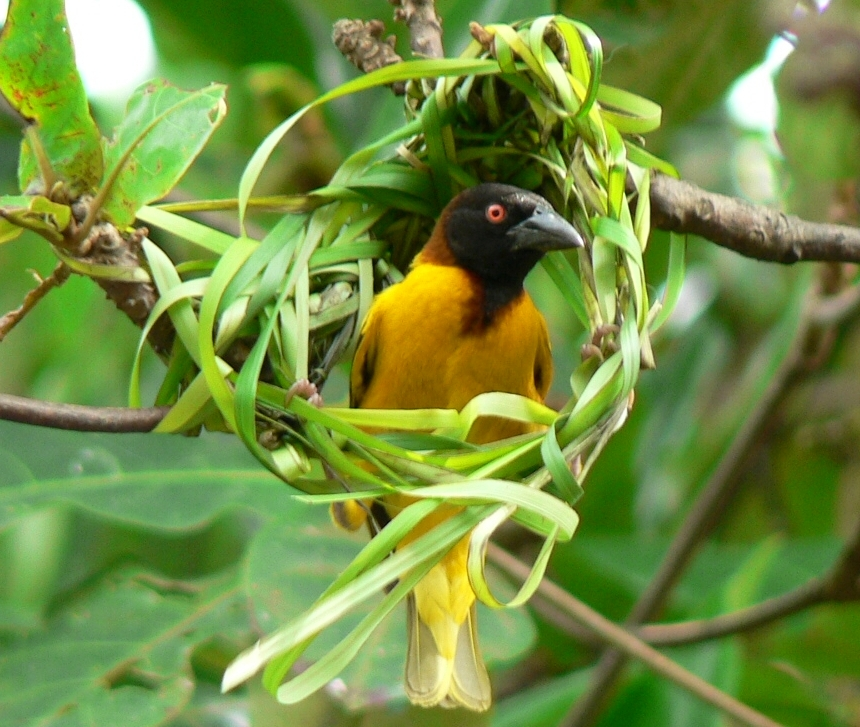
Village weaver, breeds in colonies near water

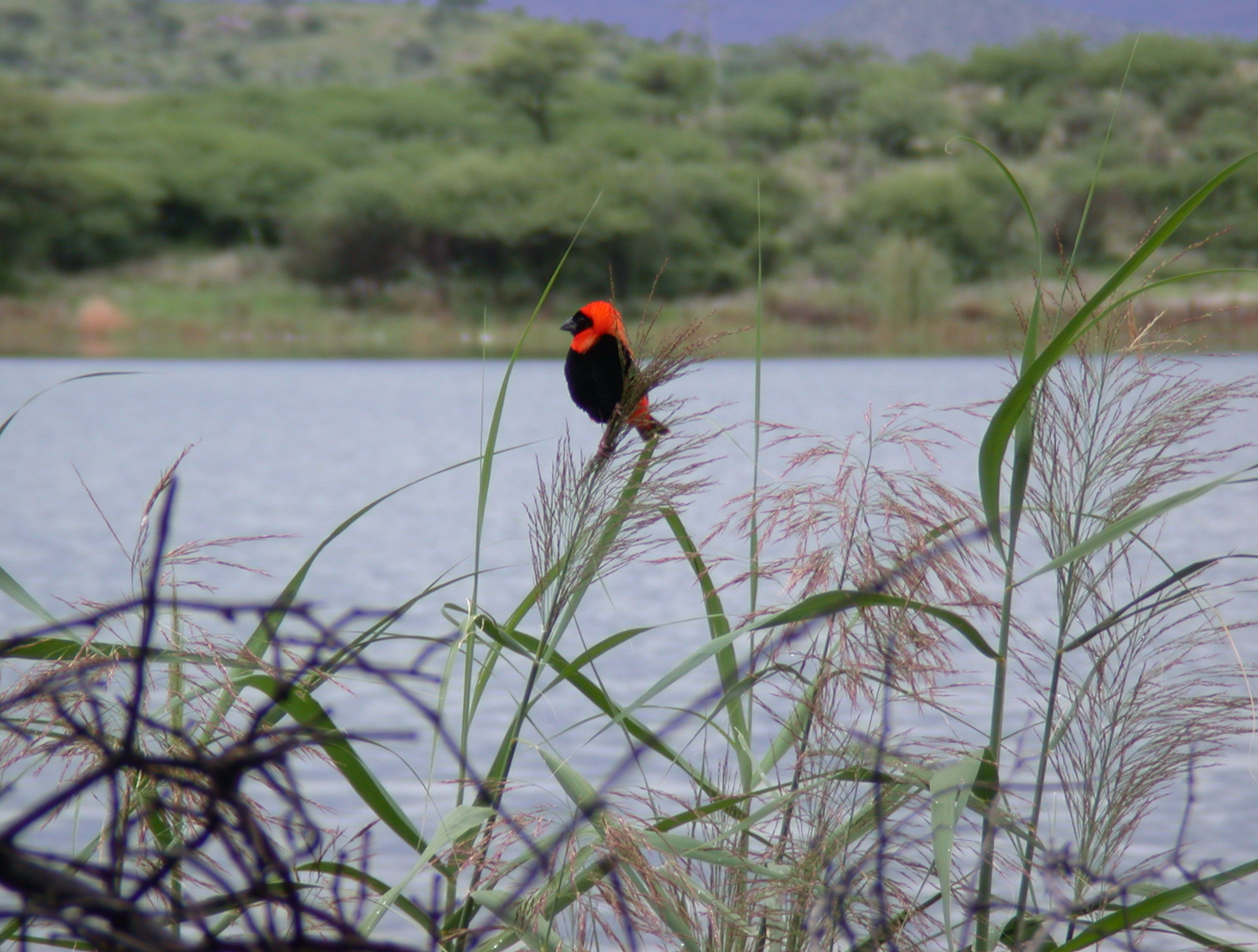
Red bishop, locally very common

The weavers are small passerine birds related to the finches. They are seed-eating birds with rounded conical bills. The males of many species are brightly coloured, usually in red or yellow and black, some species show variation in colour only in the breeding season.

- White-headed buffalo-weaver, Dinemellia dinemelli
- White-browed sparrow-weaver, Plocepasser mahali
- Chestnut-backed sparrow-weaver, Plocepasser rufoscapulatus
- Red-headed weaver, Anaplectes rubriceps
- Bertram's weaver, Ploceus bertrandi
- Baglafecht weaver, Ploceus baglafecht
- Spectacled weaver, Ploceus ocularis
- African golden-weaver, Ploceus subaureus
- Holub's golden-weaver, Ploceus xanthops
- Southern brown-throated weaver, Ploceus xanthopterus
- Lesser masked-weaver, Ploceus intermedius
- Southern masked-weaver, Ploceus velatus
- Village weaver, Ploceus cucullatus
- Forest weaver, Ploceus bicolor
- Olive-headed weaver, Ploceus olivaceiceps
- Cardinal quelea, Quelea cardinalis
- Red-headed quelea, Quelea erythrops
- Red-billed quelea, Quelea quelea
- Southern red bishop, Euplectes orix
- Black-winged bishop, Euplectes hordeaceus
- Yellow bishop, Euplectes capensis
- White-winged widowbird, Euplectes albonotatus
- Yellow-mantled widowbird, Euplectes macroura
- Red-collared widowbird, Euplectes ardens
- Fan-tailed widowbird, Euplectes axillaris
- Buff-shouldered widowbird, Euplectes psammocromius
- Grosbeak weaver, Amblyospiza albifrons

== Waxbills and allies ==
Order: Passeriformes Family: Estrildidae

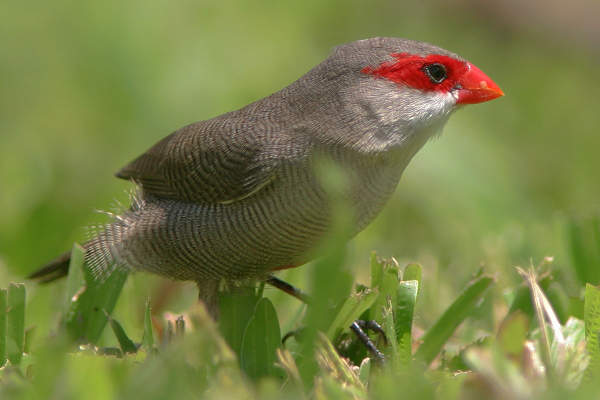
Common waxbill, occurs in grassland and marshes throughout Malawi

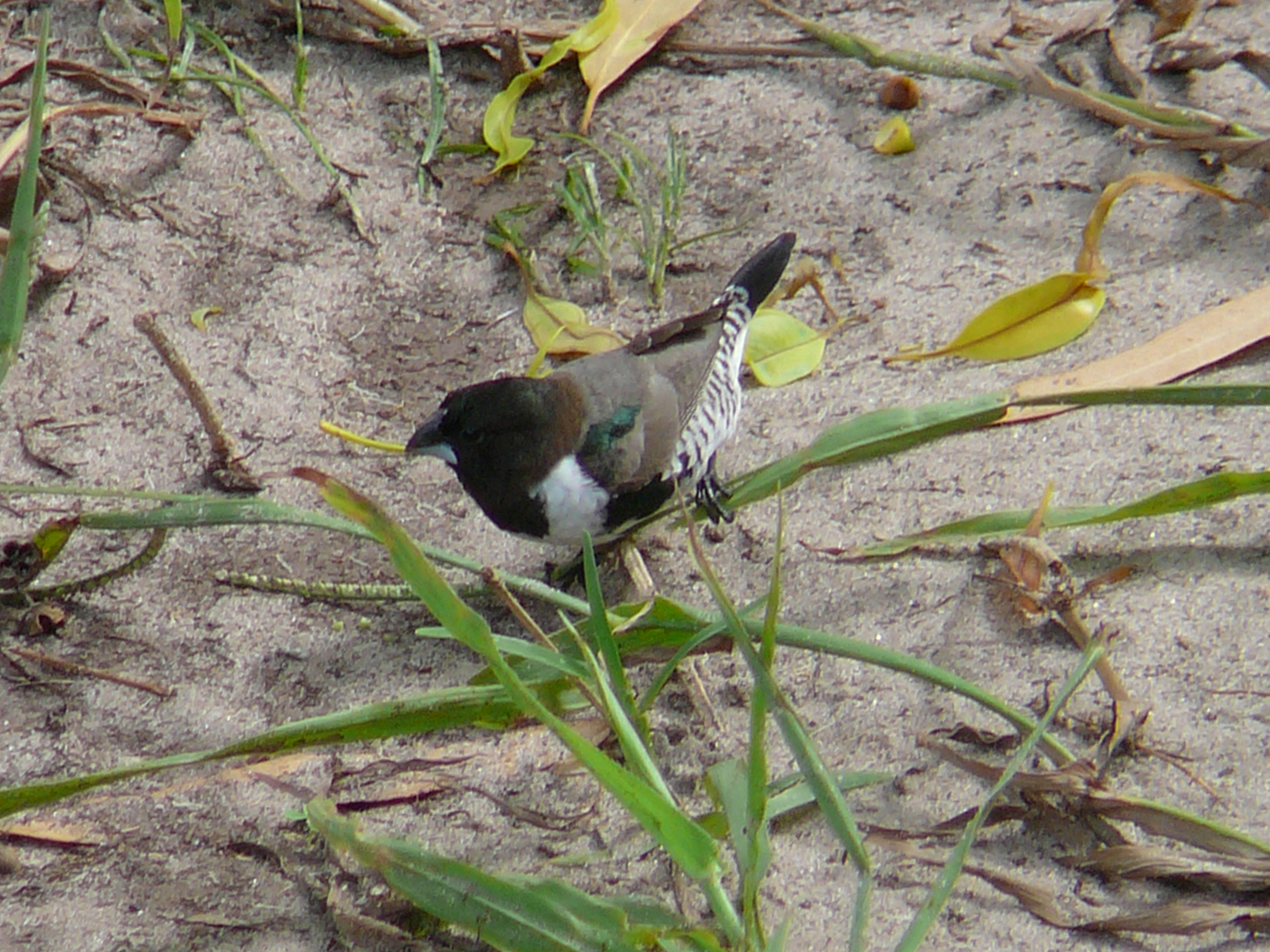
Bronze mannikin, very common in grassy areas

The estrildid finches are small passerine birds of the Old World tropics and Australasia. They are gregarious and often colonial seed eaters with short thick but pointed bills. They are all similar in structure and habits, but have wide variation in plumage colours and patterns.

- Bronze mannikin, Spermestes cucullatus
- Magpie mannikin, Spermestes fringilloides
- Black-and-white mannikin, Spermestes bicolor
- Yellow-bellied waxbill, Coccopygia quartinia
- Green-backed twinspot, Mandingoa nitidula
- Red-faced crimsonwing, Cryptospiza reichenovii
- Black-tailed waxbill, Glaucestrilda perreini
- Fawn-breasted waxbill, Estrilda paludicola
- Common waxbill, Estrilda astrild
- Crimson-rumped waxbill, Estrilda rhodopyga
- Quailfinch, Ortygospiza atricollis
- Locustfinch, Paludipasser locustella
- Cut-throat, Amadina fasciata
- Zebra waxbill, Amandava subflava
- Southern cordonbleu, Uraeginthus angolensis
- Lesser seedcracker, Pyrenestes minor
- Green-winged pytilia, Pytilia melba
- Orange-winged pytilia, Pytilia afra
- Peters's twinspot, Hypargos niveoguttatus
- Red-billed firefinch, Lagonosticta senegala
- African firefinch, Lagonosticta rubricata
- Jameson's firefinch, Lagonosticta rhodopareia
- Brown firefinch, Lagonosticta nitidula

== Indigobirds ==
Order: Passeriformes Family: Viduidae

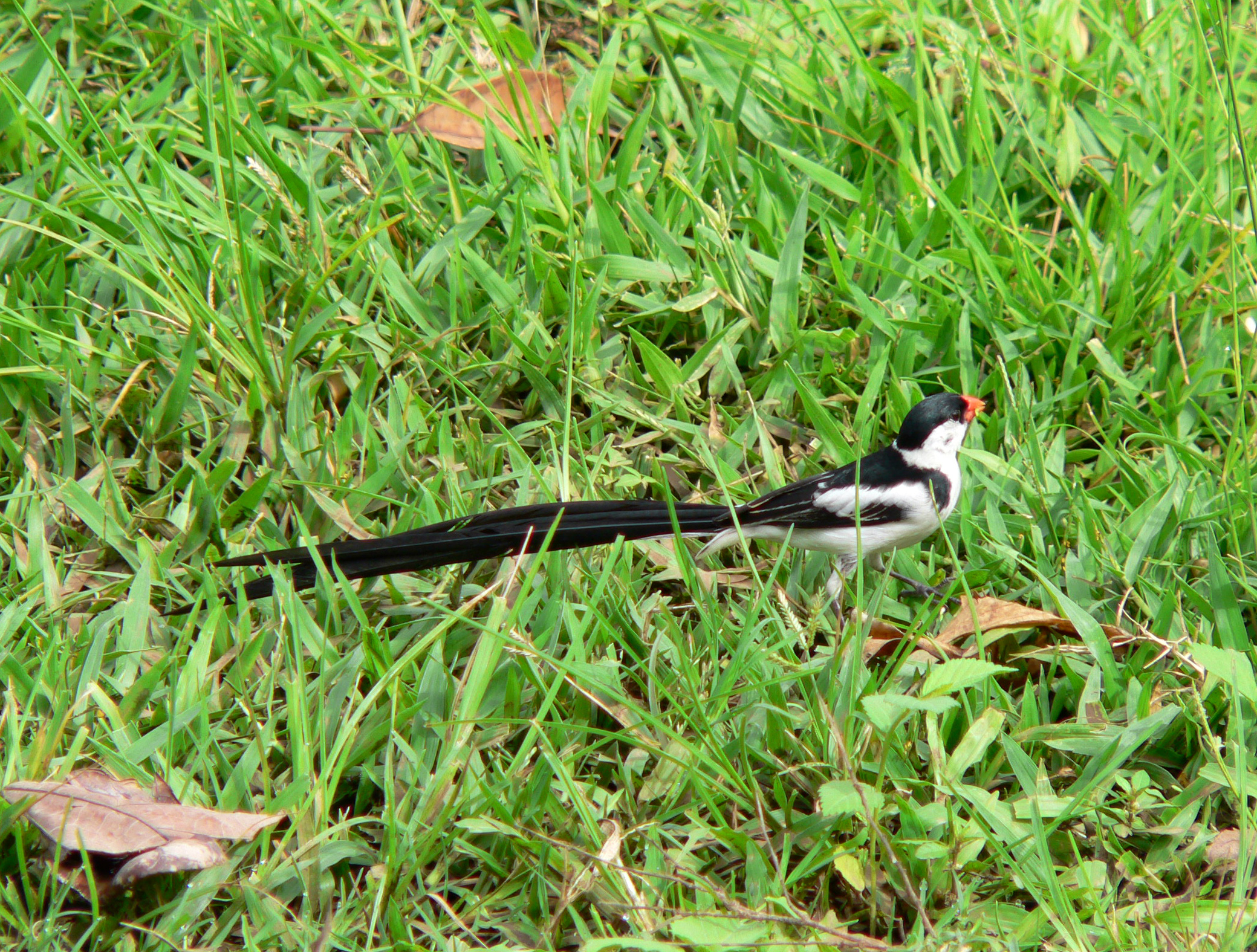
Pin-tailed whydah, lays its eggs in the nests of waxbills and mannikins

The indigobirds are finch-like species which usually have black or indigo predominating in their plumage. All are brood parasites, which lay their eggs in the nests of estrildid finches.

- Pin-tailed whydah, Vidua macroura
- Broad-tailed paradise-whydah, Vidua obtusa
- Eastern paradise-whydah, Vidua paradisaea
- Village indigobird, Vidua chalybeata
- Variable indigobird, Vidua funerea
- Purple indigobird, Vidua purpurascens
- Green indigobird, Vidua codringtoni
- Parasitic weaver, Anomalospiza imberbis

== Old World sparrows ==
Order: Passeriformes Family: Passeridae

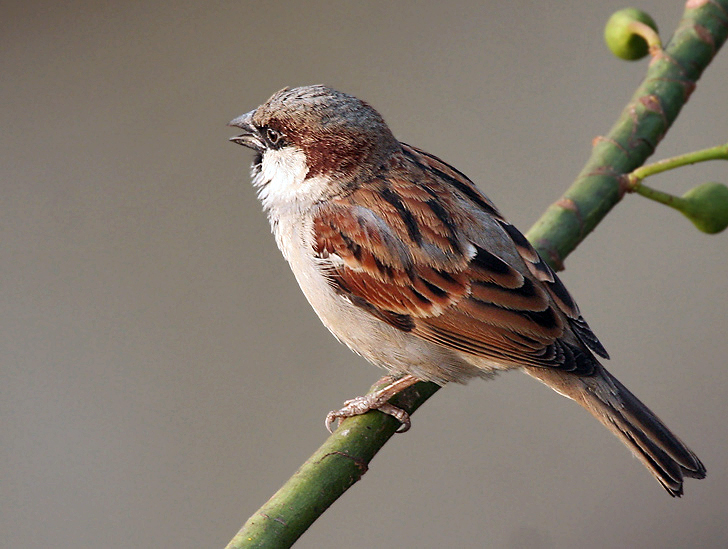
House sparrow, introduced to South Africa, this species has since spread, reaching Malawi in 1967.

Old World sparrows are small passerine birds. In general, sparrows tend to be small, plump, brown or grey birds with short tails and short powerful beaks. Sparrows are seed eaters, but they also consume small insects.

- House sparrow, Passer domesticus (I)
- Northern gray-headed sparrow, Passer griseus
- Swahili sparrow, Passer suahelicus
- Southern gray-headed sparrow, Passer diffusus
- Yellow-throated bush sparrow, Gymnoris superciliaris

== Wagtails and pipits ==
Order: Passeriformes Family: Motacillidae

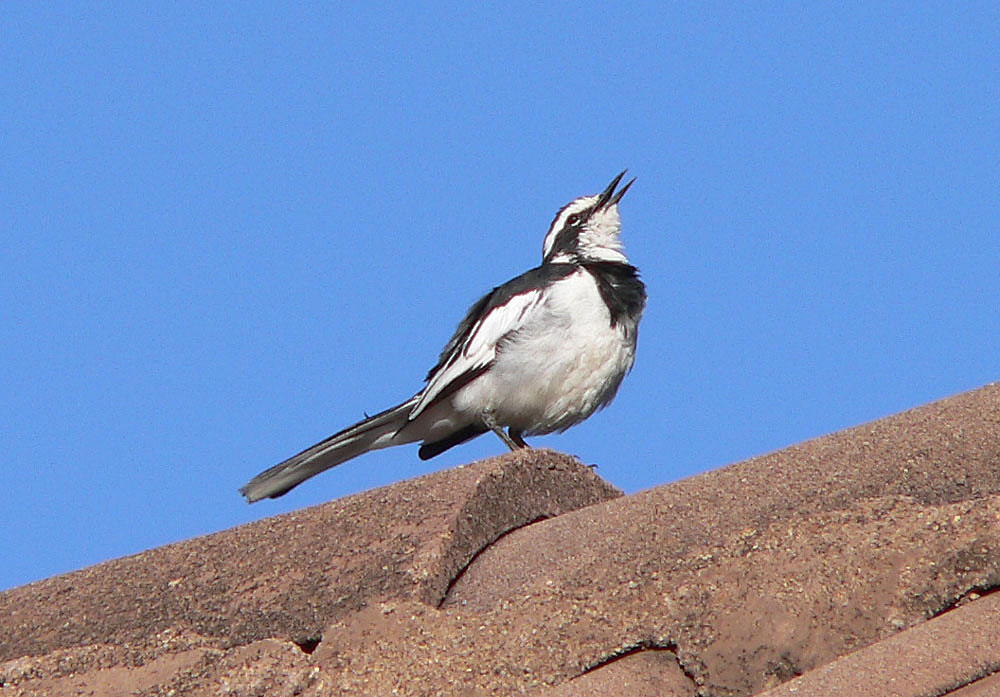
African pied wagtail, common near water and in urban areas

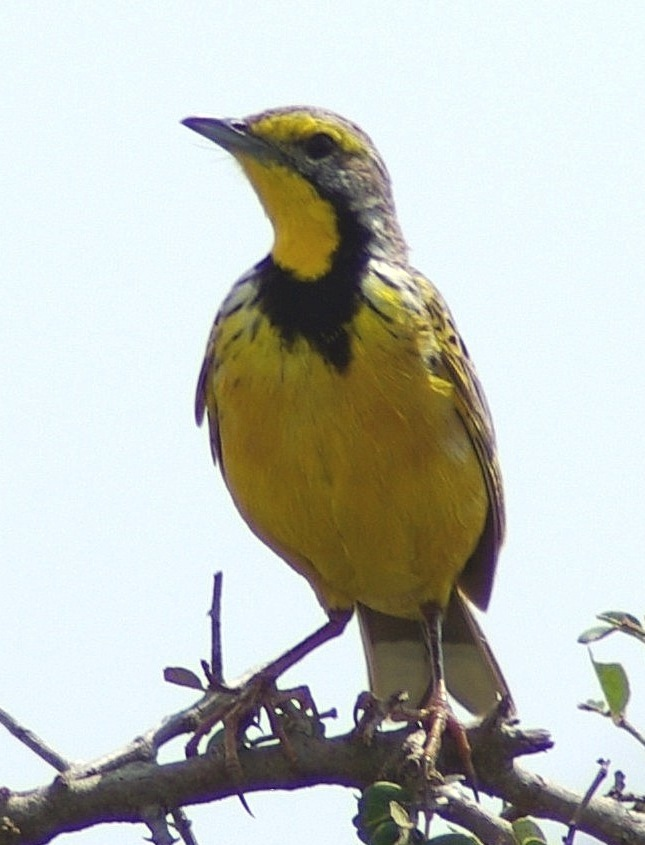
Yellow-throated longclaw, fairly common in grassland

Motacillidae is a family of small passerine birds with medium to long tails. They include the wagtails, longclaws and pipits. They are slender, ground feeding insectivores of open country.

- Mountain wagtail, Motacilla clara
- Gray wagtail, Motacilla cinerea
- Western yellow wagtail, Motacilla flava
- African pied wagtail, Motacilla aguimp
- White wagtail, Motacilla alba (A)
- African pipit, Anthus cinnamomeus
- Woodland pipit, Anthus nyassae
- Long-billed pipit, Anthus similis
- Plain-backed pipit, Anthus leucophrys
- Buffy pipit, Anthus vaalensis
- Striped pipit, Anthus lineiventris
- Tree pipit, Anthus trivialis
- Bush pipit, Anthus caffer
- Golden pipit, Tmetothylacus tenellus (A)
- Yellow-throated longclaw, Macronyx croceus
- Rosy-throated longclaw, Macronyx ameliae

== Finches, euphonias, and allies ==
Order: Passeriformes Family: Fringillidae

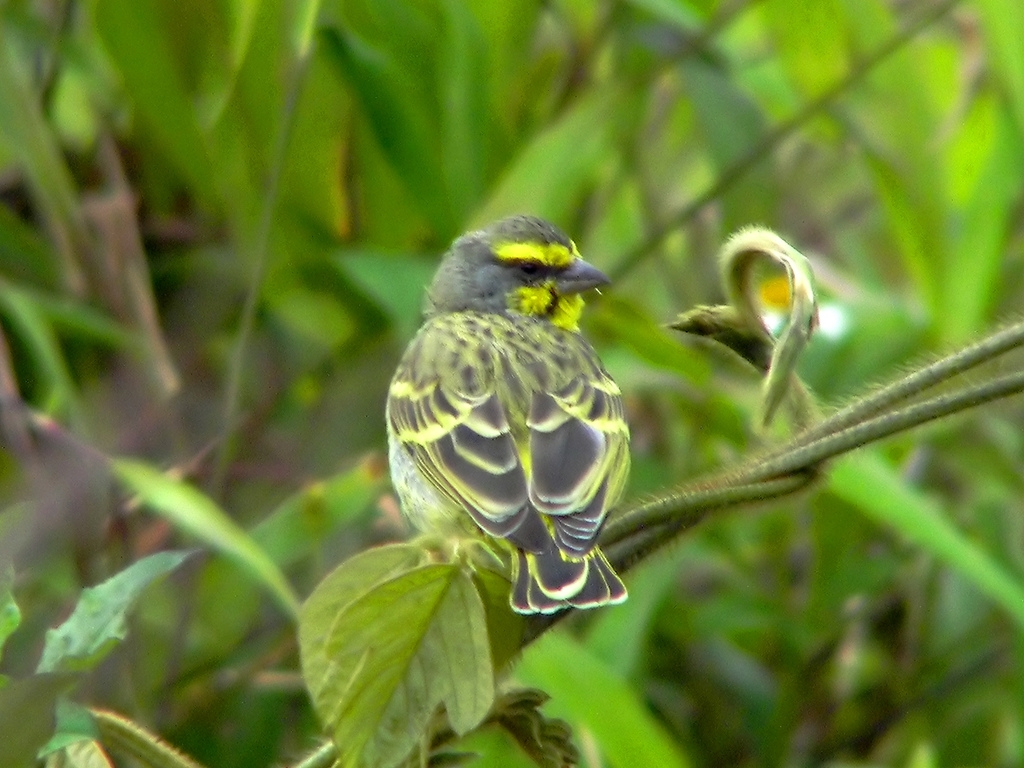
Yellow-fronted canary, common everywhere except high mountain regions

Finches are seed-eating passerine birds, that are small to moderately large and have a strong beak, usually conical and in some species very large. All have twelve tail feathers and nine primaries. These birds have a bouncing flight with alternating bouts of flapping and gliding on closed wings, and most sing well.

- Oriole finch, Linurgus olivaceus
- Yellow-fronted canary, Crithagra mozambica
- Southern citril, Crithagra hyposticuta
- Lemon-breasted seedeater, Crithagra citrinipectus
- Brimstone canary, Crithagra sulphurata
- Yellow-browed seedeater, Crithagra whytii
- Black-eared seedeater, Crithagra mennelli
- Reichard's seedeater, Crithagra reichardi
- Yellow-crowned canary, Serinus flavivertex

== Old World buntings ==
Order: Passeriformes Family: Emberizidae

The emberizids are a large family of passerine birds. They are seed-eating birds with distinctively shaped bills. Many emberizid species have distinctive head patterns.

- Cabanis's bunting, Emberiza cabanisi
- Golden-breasted bunting, Emberiza flaviventris
- Cape bunting, Emberiza capensis
- Vincent's bunting, Emberiza vincenti
- Cinnamon-breasted bunting, Emberiza tahapisi

== See also ==
- List of birds
- Lists of birds by region
