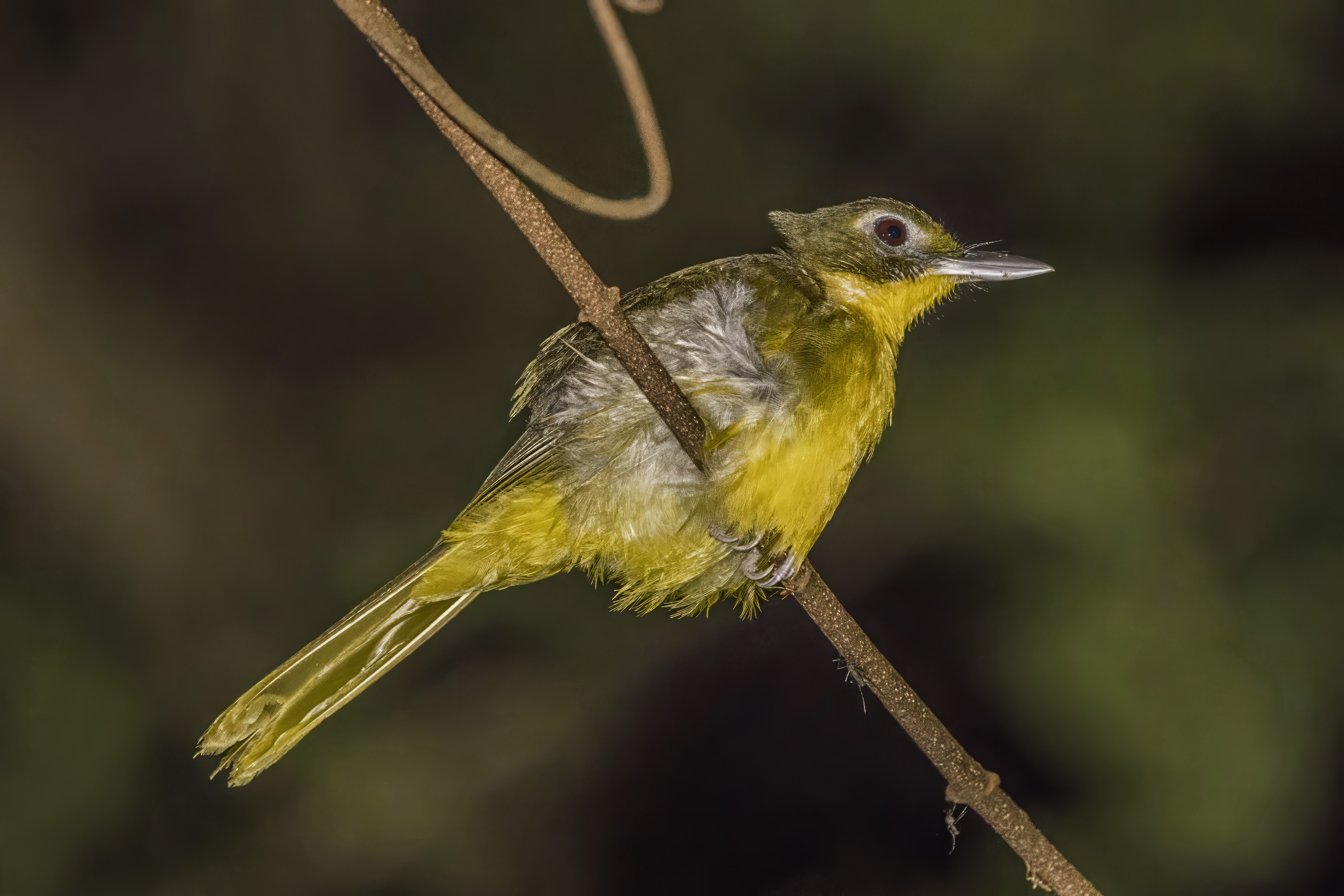
- Ankasa Forest Reserve, Ghana

Conservation status
- Near Threatened (IUCN 3.1)

Scientific classification
- Kingdom: Animalia
- Phylum: Chordata
- Class: Aves
- Order: Passeriformes
- Family: Pycnonotidae
- Genus: Bleda
- Species: B. eximius

Binomial name
- Bleda eximius (Hartlaub, 1855)
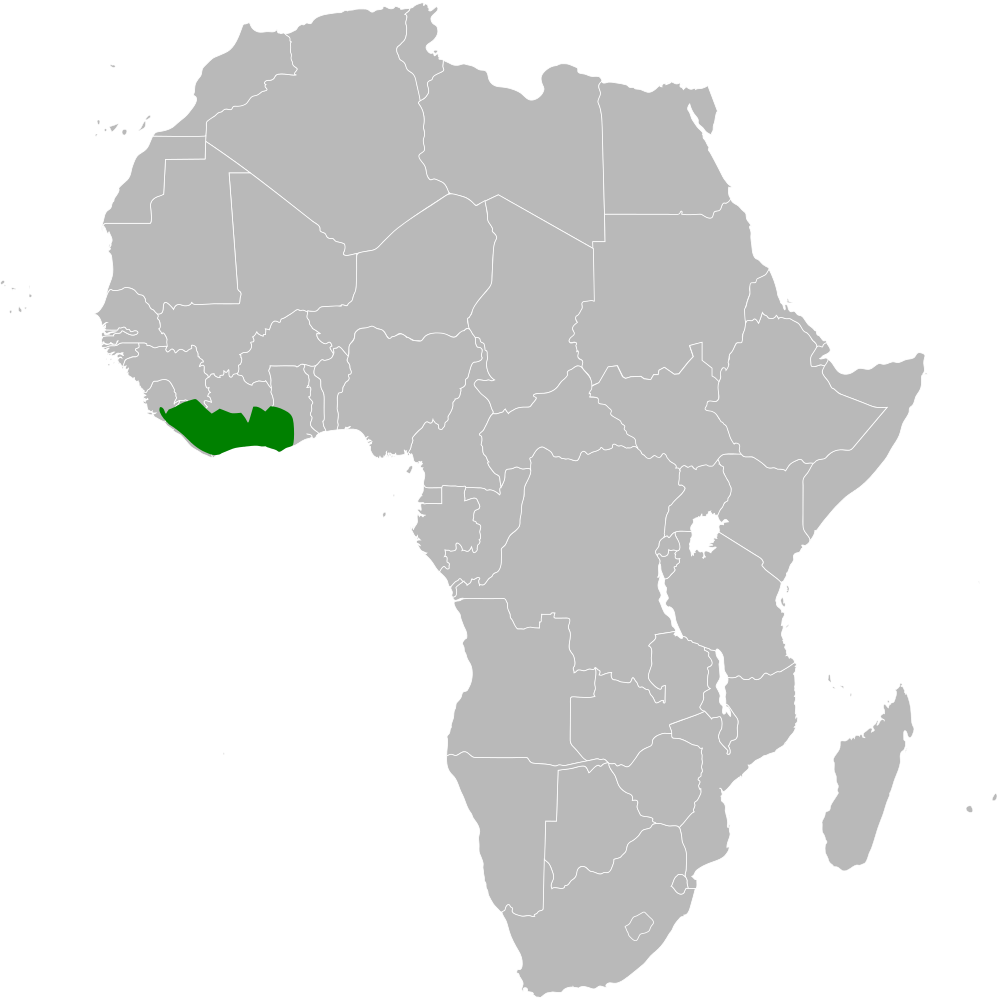

Synonyms
- Bleda eximia; Trichophorus eximius

= Green-tailed bristlebill =

Species of songbird

The green-tailed bristlebill (Bleda eximius) is a species of songbird in the bulbul family, Pycnonotidae. It is found in West Africa from Sierra Leone to Ghana. Its natural habitat is tropical moist lowland forests. It is threatened by habitat loss. The green-tailed bristlebill was originally described in the genus Trichophorus (a synonym for Criniger). Formerly, some authorities considered the yellow-lored bristlebill as conspecific with the green-tailed bristlebill.
