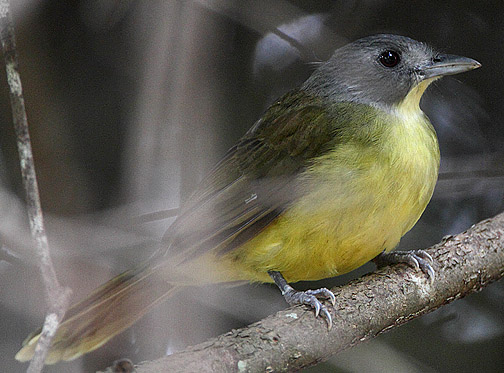
- Grey-headed bristlebill (Bleda canicapillus)

Scientific classification
- Kingdom: Animalia
- Phylum: Chordata
- Class: Aves
- Order: Passeriformes
- Family: Pycnonotidae
- Genus: Bleda; Bonaparte, 1857

Type species
- Dasycephala syndactyla (Red-tailed bristlebill) Swainson, 1837

Species
- See text
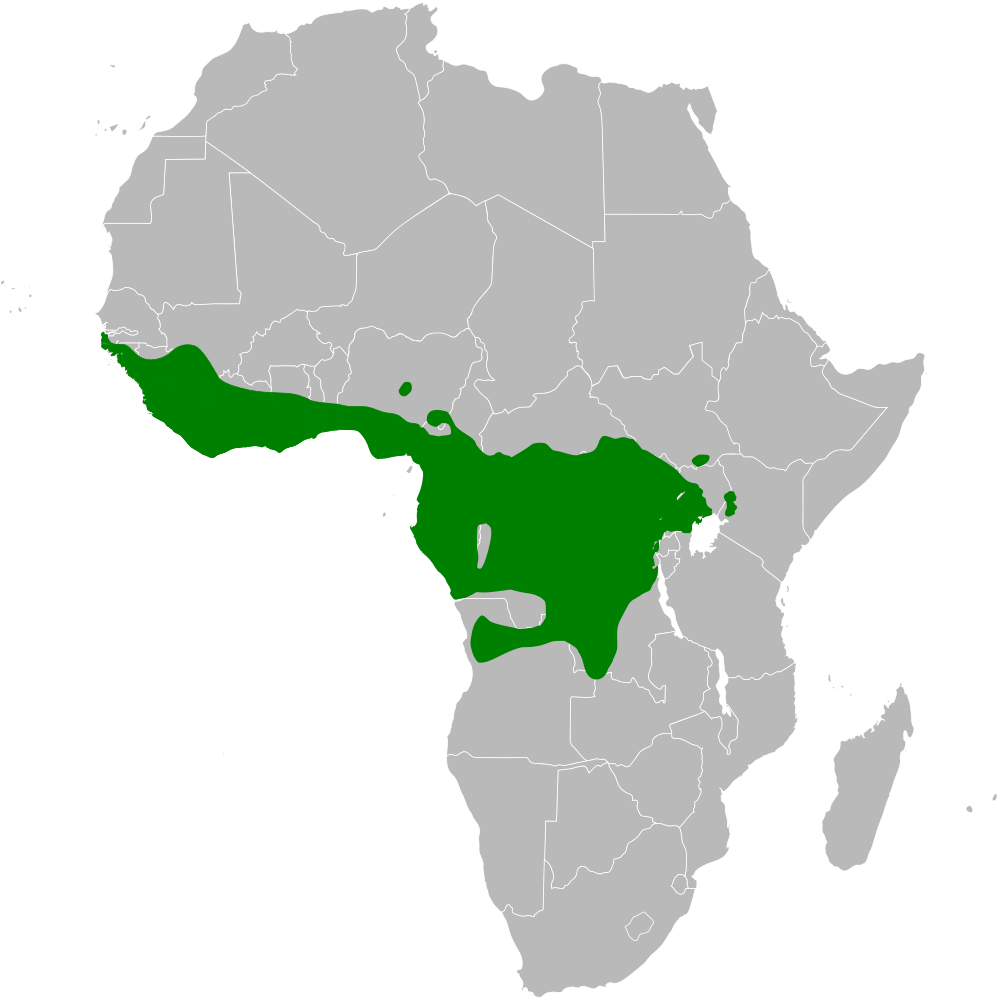

Synonyms
- Xenocichla

= Bristlebill =

Bristlebills

Genus of birds

The bristlebills are a genus Bleda of passerine birds in the bulbul family Pycnonotidae. They are found in the forest understorey of western and central Africa. They forage for insects at or near ground-level, often near water. They will follow driver ant swarms to catch prey items fleeing from the ants and they frequently join mixed-species feeding flocks.

They are 18–23 cm long with fairly long, stout bills. The upperparts are mainly green-brown while the underparts are yellow. The birds have whistling songs.

The nest is made of leaves or sticks and built in a shrub or small tree. Two eggs are laid.

== Taxonomy ==
The genus Bleda was introduced in 1857 by the French naturalist Charles Lucien Bonaparte with the red-tailed bristlebill as the type species. The genus was named after Bleda, elder brother of Attila and joint ruler of the Huns.

=== Species ===
The genus contains the following five species:

Image	Scientific name	Common name	Distribution
	Red-tailed bristlebill	Bleda syndactylus	African tropical rainforest
	Green-tailed bristlebill	Bleda eximius	Upper Guinean forests
	Grey-headed bristlebill	Bleda canicapillus	Guinean Forests of West Africa
	Yellow-lored bristlebill	Bleda notatus	Western Congolian rainforests
	Yellow-eyed bristlebill	Bleda ugandae	Congo Basin and Uganda

=== Former species ===
Formerly, some authorities also considered the following species (or subspecies) as species within the genus Bleda:

- Kakamega greenbul (as Xenocichla kakamegae)
- Olive-breasted greenbul (as Xenocichla kikuyuensis)
- Mountain greenbul (as Xenocichla nigriceps)
- Black-browed greenbul (as Xenocichla fusciceps)
- Yellow-throated greenbul (as Xenocichla chlorigula)
- Stripe-cheeked greenbul (as Xenocichla milanjensis)
- Stripe-faced greenbul (as Xenocichla striifacies)
- Sjöstedt's greenbul (as Xenocichla clamans)
- Yellow-throated leaflove (as Xenocichla flavicollis)
- Uganda yellow-throated greenbul (as Xenocichla pallidigula)
- Gabon leaflove (as Xenocichla orientalis)
- Placid greenbul (as Xenocichla placida)
- Xavier's greenbul (as Xenocichla Xavieri)
- White-throated greenbul (as Xenocichla albigularis)
- Yellow-streaked greenbul (tenuirostris) (as Xenocichla tenuirostris)
- Sharpe's greenbul (as Bleda alfredi)
- Grey-headed greenbul (as Xenocichla poliocephala)
- Lowland tiny greenbul (as Xenocichla debilis)
- Yellow-bearded greenbul (as Xenocichla olivacea)
