= Leaflove =

Leaflove may refer to:

- Red-tailed leaflove, also known as African leaflove, common leaflove, leaflove and plain leaflove, a species of bird found in western and central Africa
  - Uela leaflove and Gabon leaflove, subspecies
- Simple leaflove, alternate name for the simple greenbul, a species of bird found in western and central Africa
- Yellow-throated leaflove, a species of bird found in western and central Africa
  - Congo white-throated leaflove, subspecies
