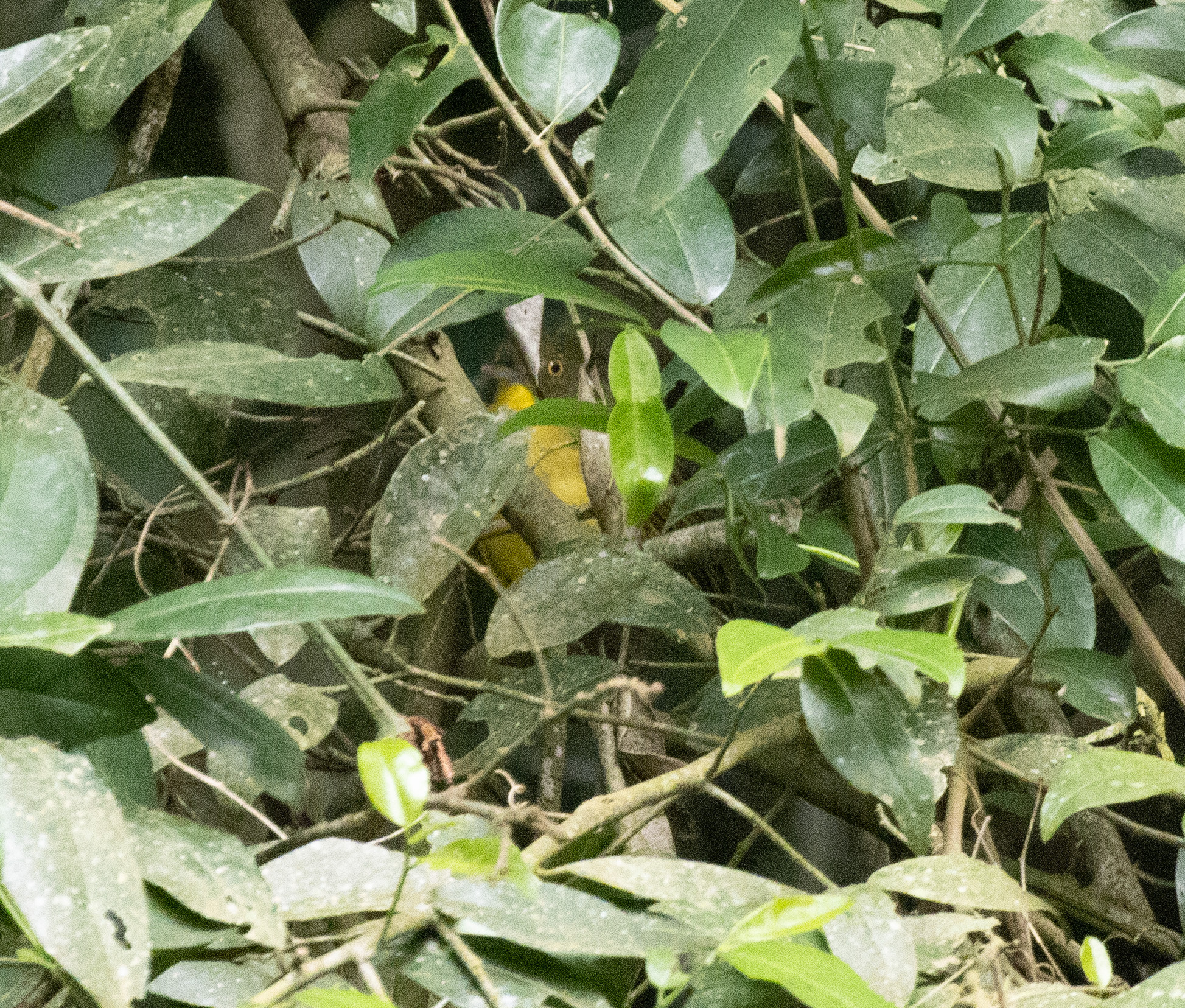

Conservation status
- Least Concern (IUCN 3.1)

Scientific classification
- Kingdom: Animalia
- Phylum: Chordata
- Class: Aves
- Order: Passeriformes
- Family: Pycnonotidae
- Genus: Bleda
- Species: B. ugandae

Binomial name
- Bleda ugandae Van Someren, 1915

= Yellow-eyed bristlebill =

Species of songbird

The yellow-eyed bristlebill (Bleda ugandae) is a species of songbird in the bulbul family, Pycnonotidae. It is found in central Africa.
