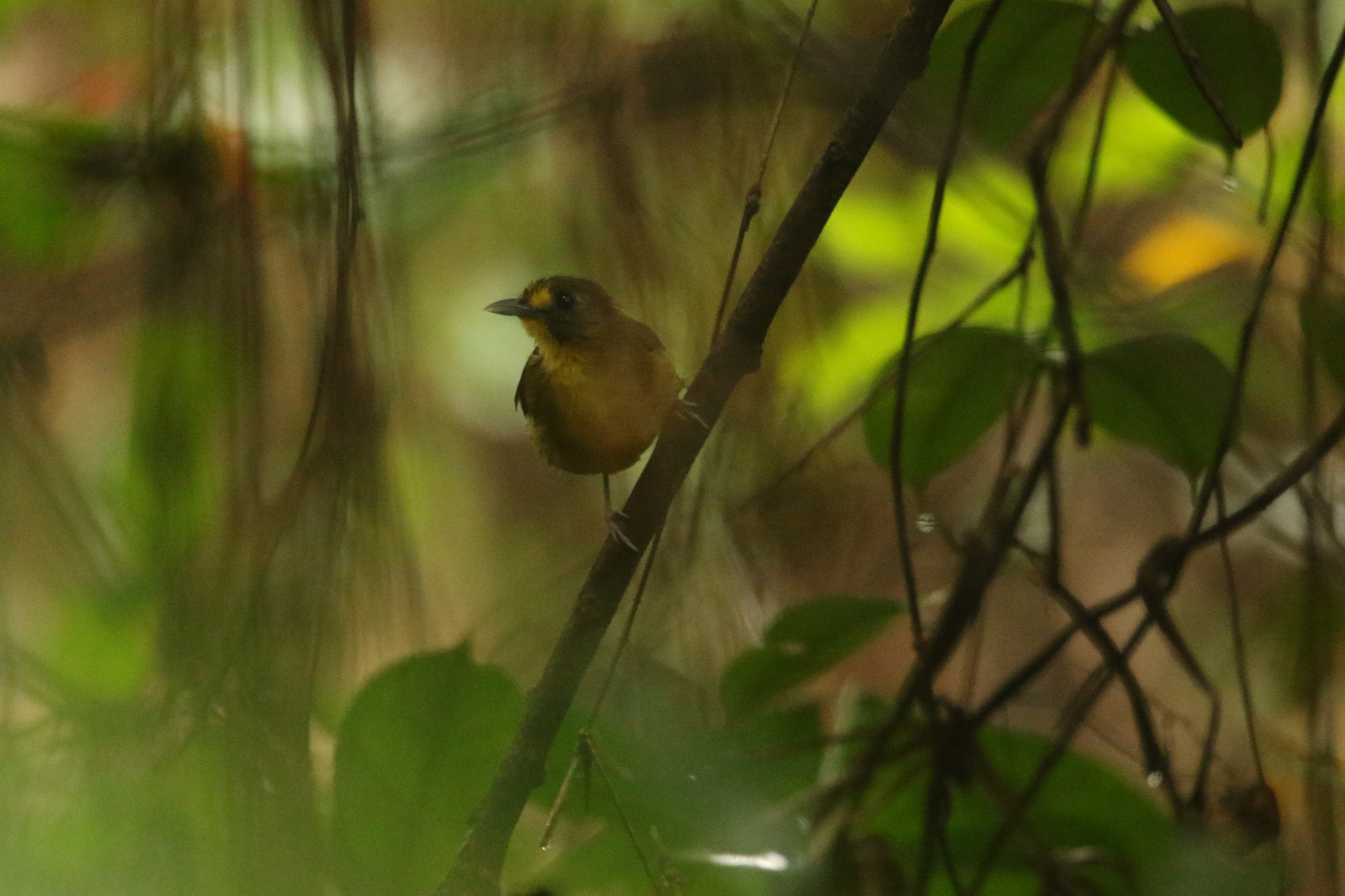

Conservation status
- Least Concern (IUCN 3.1)

Scientific classification
- Kingdom: Animalia
- Phylum: Chordata
- Class: Aves
- Order: Passeriformes
- Family: Pycnonotidae
- Genus: Bleda
- Species: B. notatus

Binomial name
- Bleda notatus (Cassin, 1856)
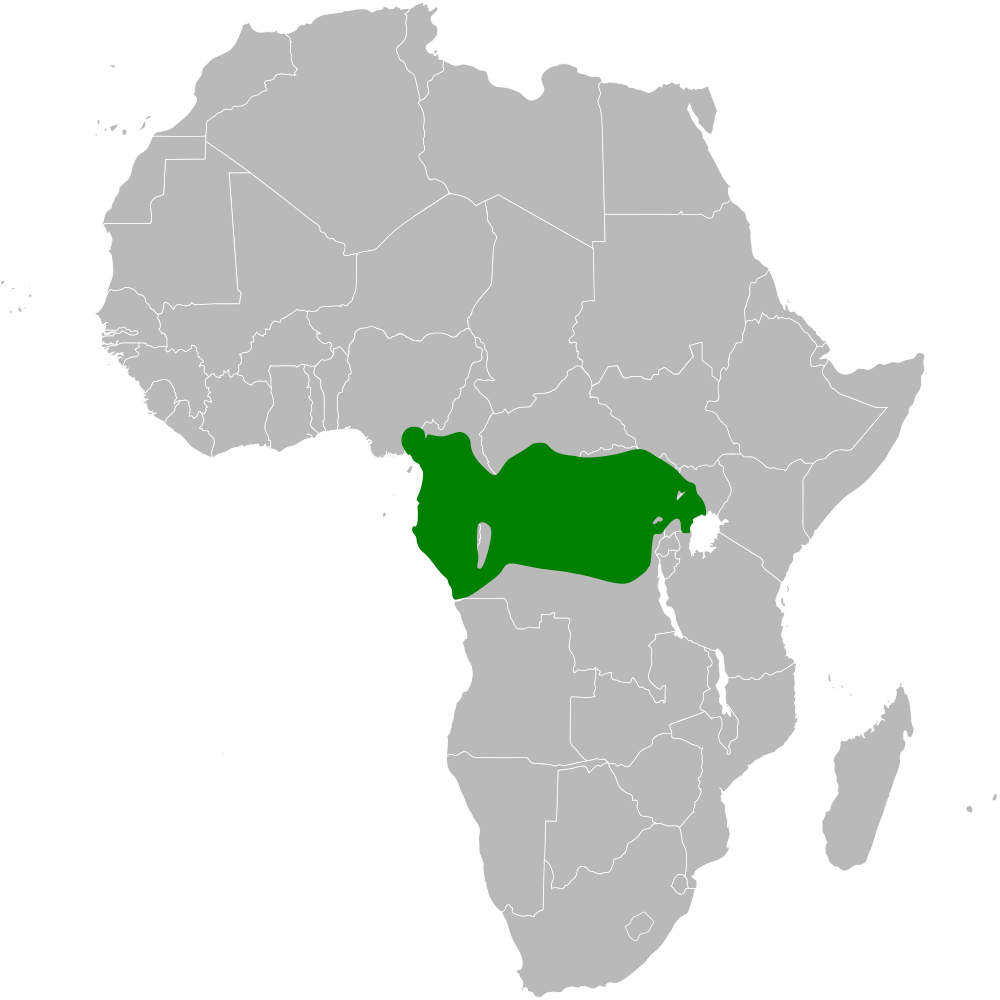

Synonyms
- Bleda eximia notata; Bleda eximia notatus; Bleda eximius notata; Bleda eximius notatus; Bleda notata; Trichophorus notatus

= Yellow-lored bristlebill =

Species of songbird

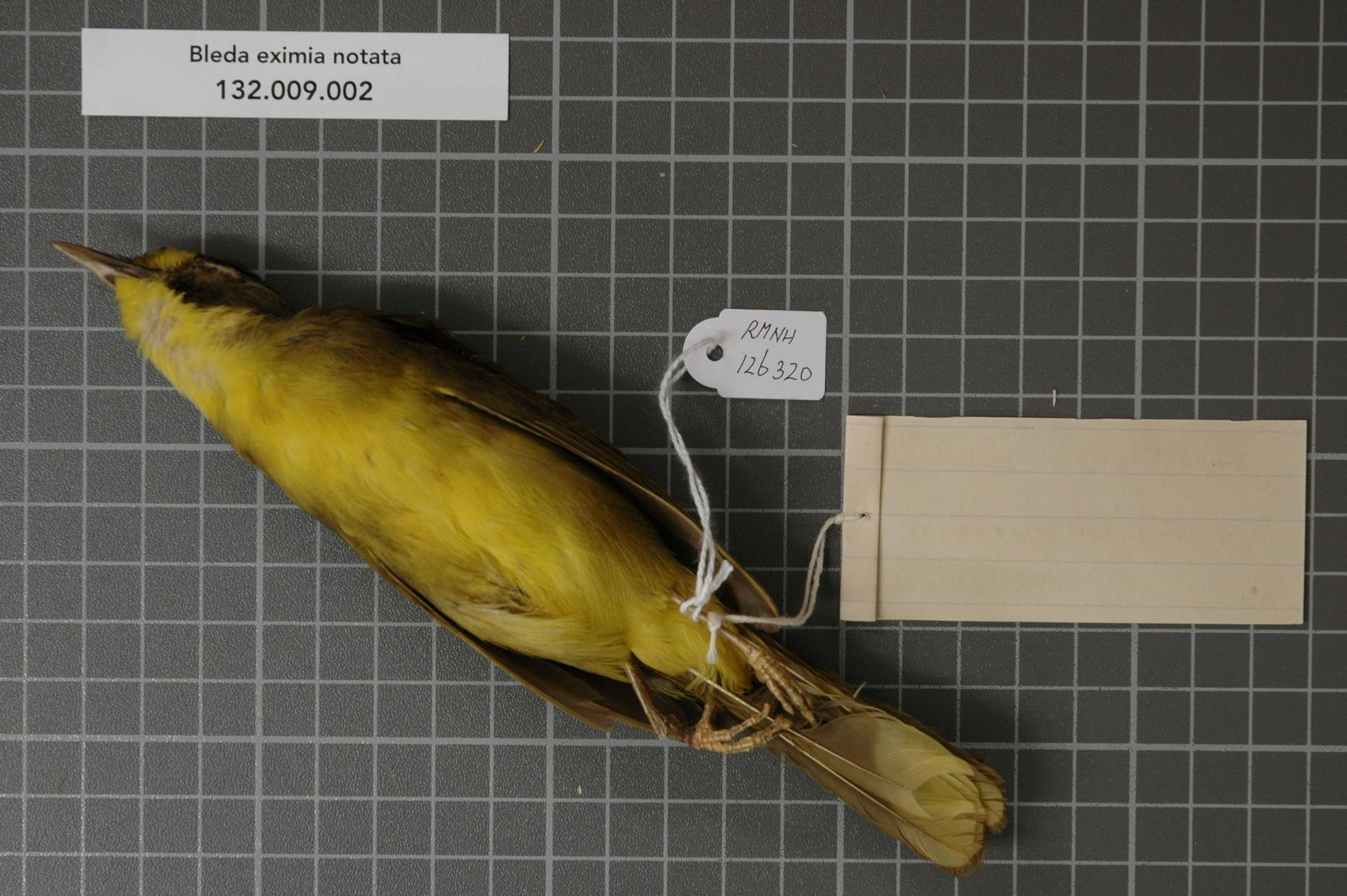

The yellow-lored bristlebill or lesser bristlebill (Bleda notatus) is a species of songbird in the bulbul family, Pycnonotidae. It is found in central Africa. It is most often found at lower elevations.

== Taxonomy and systematics ==
The yellow-lored bristlebill was originally described in the genus Trichophorus (a synonym for Criniger). Formerly, some authorities considered the yellow-lored bristlebill as conspecific with the green-tailed bristlebill.
