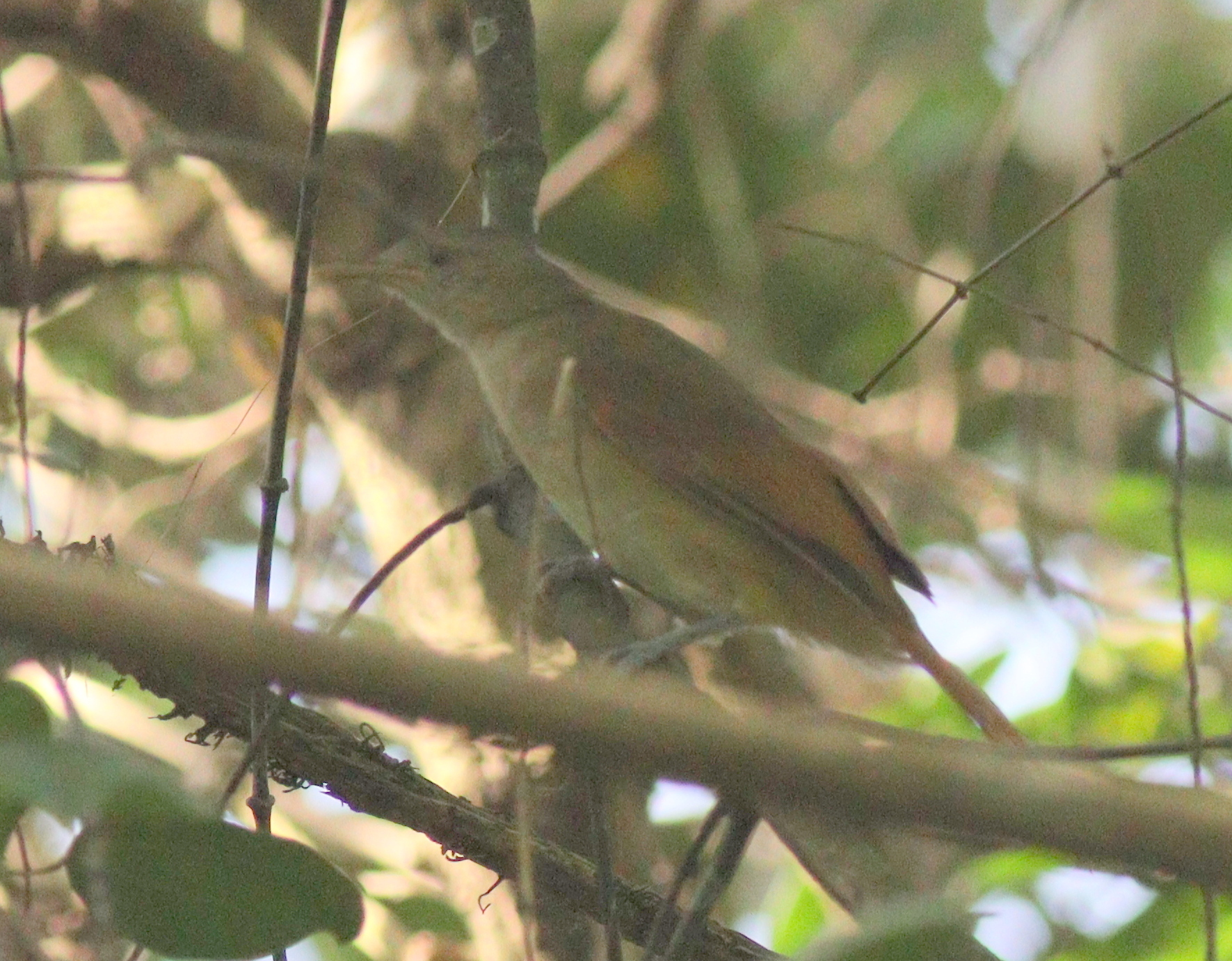
- Red-tailed leaflove at Ho West, Ghana

Conservation status
- Least Concern (IUCN 3.1)

Scientific classification
- Kingdom: Animalia
- Phylum: Chordata
- Class: Aves
- Order: Passeriformes
- Family: Pycnonotidae
- Genus: Phyllastrephus
- Species: P. scandens

Binomial name
- Phyllastrephus scandens Swainson, 1837
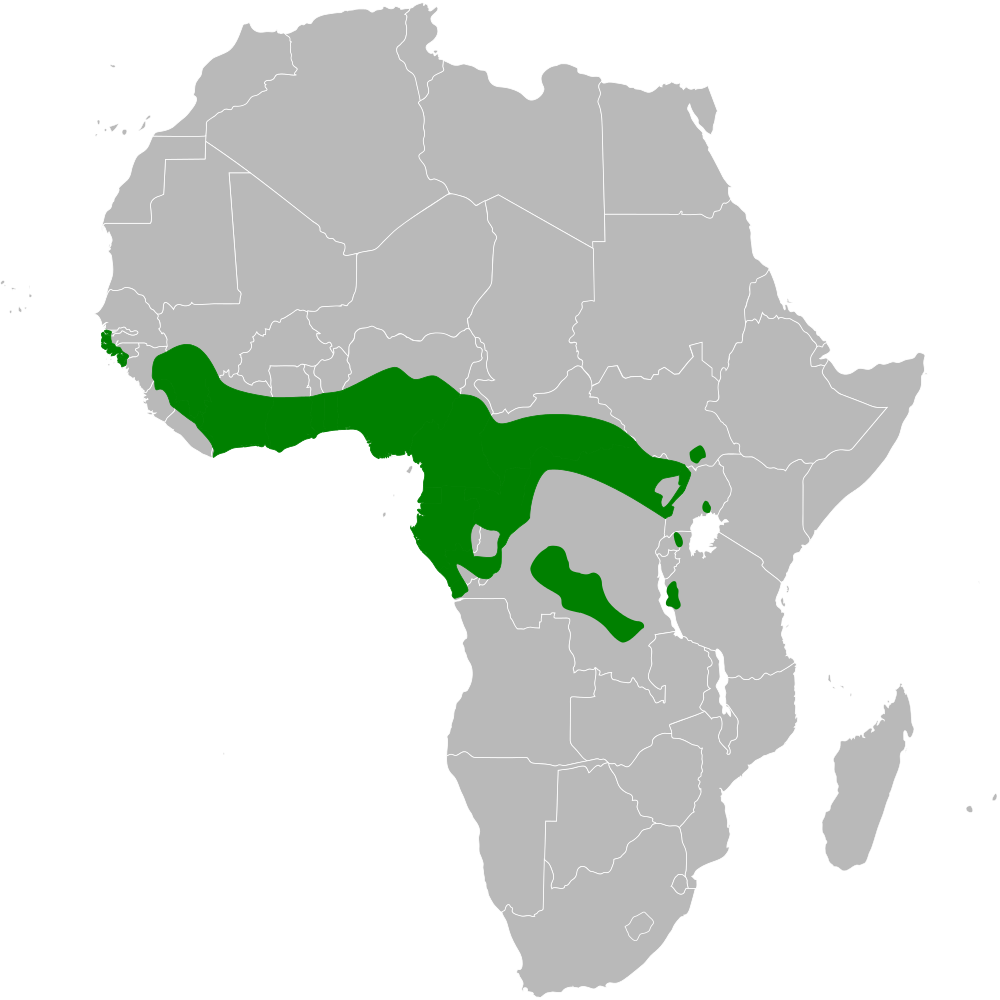

Synonyms
- Pyrrhurus scandens

= Red-tailed leaflove =

Species of bird

The red-tailed leaflove (Phyllastrephus scandens) is a species of leaflove in the bulbul family, Pycnonotidae. It is mainly native to the African tropical rainforest.

== Taxonomy and systematics ==
Although originally described in the genus Phyllastrephus, the red-tailed leaflove was briefly transferred to the former genus Pyrrhurus (now subsumed into Phyllastrephus) during the period 2009-2010 by the IOC. Some other authorities continue to classify the red-tailed leaflove in the genus Pyrrhurus. Alternate names for the red-tailed leaflove include the African leaflove, common leaflove, leaflove and plain leaflove.

=== Subspecies ===
Two subspecies are recognized:

- Uele leaflove (P. s. scandens) - Swainson, 1837: Found from Gambia and Senegal to northern Cameroon
- Gabon leaflove (P. s. orientalis) - (Hartlaub, 1883): Originally described as a separate species in the genus Xenocichla (a synonym for Bleda). Found from northern Cameroon to southern Sudan, central Uganda, western Tanzania and southern Democratic Republic of the Congo

== Distribution and habitat ==
The red-tailed leaflove is found across western and central Africa. Its natural habitats are subtropical or tropical moist lowland forests and moist savanna.
