= Xavier's greenbul =

Conservation status
- Least Concern (IUCN 3.1)

Scientific classification
- Kingdom: Animalia
- Phylum: Chordata
- Class: Aves
- Order: Passeriformes
- Family: Pycnonotidae
- Genus: Phyllastrephus
- Species: P. xavieri

Binomial name
- Phyllastrephus xavieri (Oustalet, 1892)
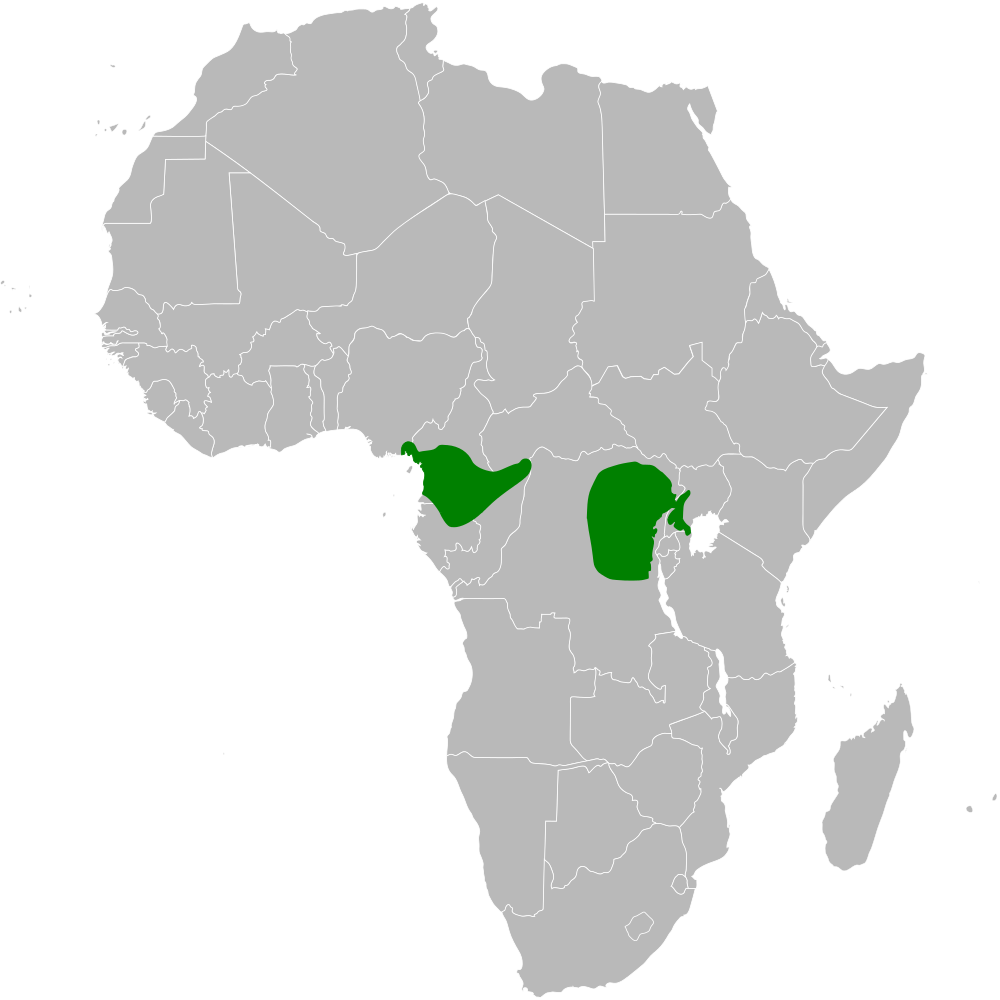

Synonyms
- Phyllastrephus icterinus xavieri; Xenocichla xavieri

Species of songbird

Xavier's greenbul (Phyllastrephus xavieri) is a species of songbird in the bulbul family, Pycnonotidae. It is found in central Africa. Its natural habitats are subtropical or tropical dry forests and subtropical or tropical moist lowland forests.

== Taxonomy and systematics ==
Xavier's greenbul was originally described in the genus Xenocichla (a synonym for Bleda). Some authorities have considered Xavier's greenbul to be a subspecies of the icterine greenbul. The name commemorates the French explorer Xavier Dybowski who collected natural history specimens in the Congo. Alternate names for Xavier's greenbul include the greater icterine bulbul, greater icterine greenbul and Uganda icterine bulbul.

=== Subspecies ===
Two subspecies are recognized:

- P. x. serlei - Chapin, 1949: north and west of Mt. Cameroon (south-western Cameroon)
- Grauer's white-throated greenbul (P. x. xavieri) - (Oustalet, 1892): from Cameroon to western Uganda and north-western Tanzania
