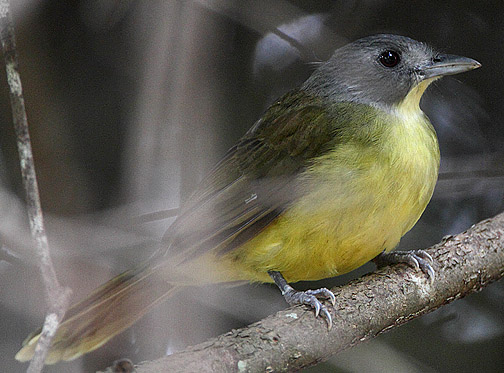

Conservation status
- Least Concern (IUCN 3.1)

Scientific classification
- Kingdom: Animalia
- Phylum: Chordata
- Class: Aves
- Order: Passeriformes
- Family: Pycnonotidae
- Genus: Bleda
- Species: B. canicapillus

Binomial name
- Bleda canicapillus (Hartlaub, 1854)
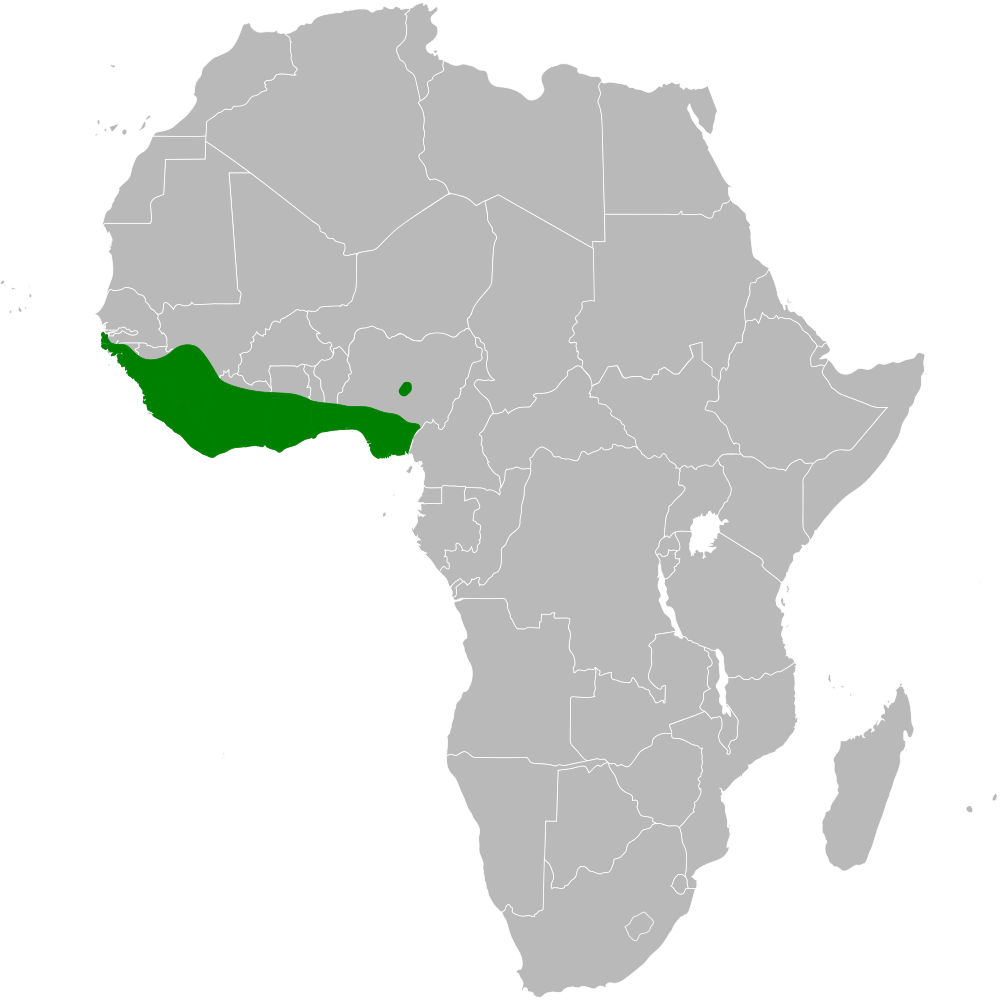

Synonyms
- Bleda canicapilla; Trichophorus canicapillus

= Grey-headed bristlebill =

Species of songbird

The grey-headed bristlebill (Bleda canicapillus) is a species of songbird in the bulbul family, Pycnonotidae. It is found in West Africa. Its natural habitats are subtropical or tropical dry forests, subtropical or tropical moist lowland forests, and subtropical or tropical swamps.

== Taxonomy and systematics ==
The grey-headed bristlebill was originally described in the genus Trichophorus (a synonym for Criniger).

=== Subspecies ===
Two subspecies are recognized:

- B. c. canicapillus - (Hartlaub, 1854): Found from Guinea-Bissau to south-western Cameroon
- B. c. morelorum - Érard, 1991: Found in Senegal and Gambia
