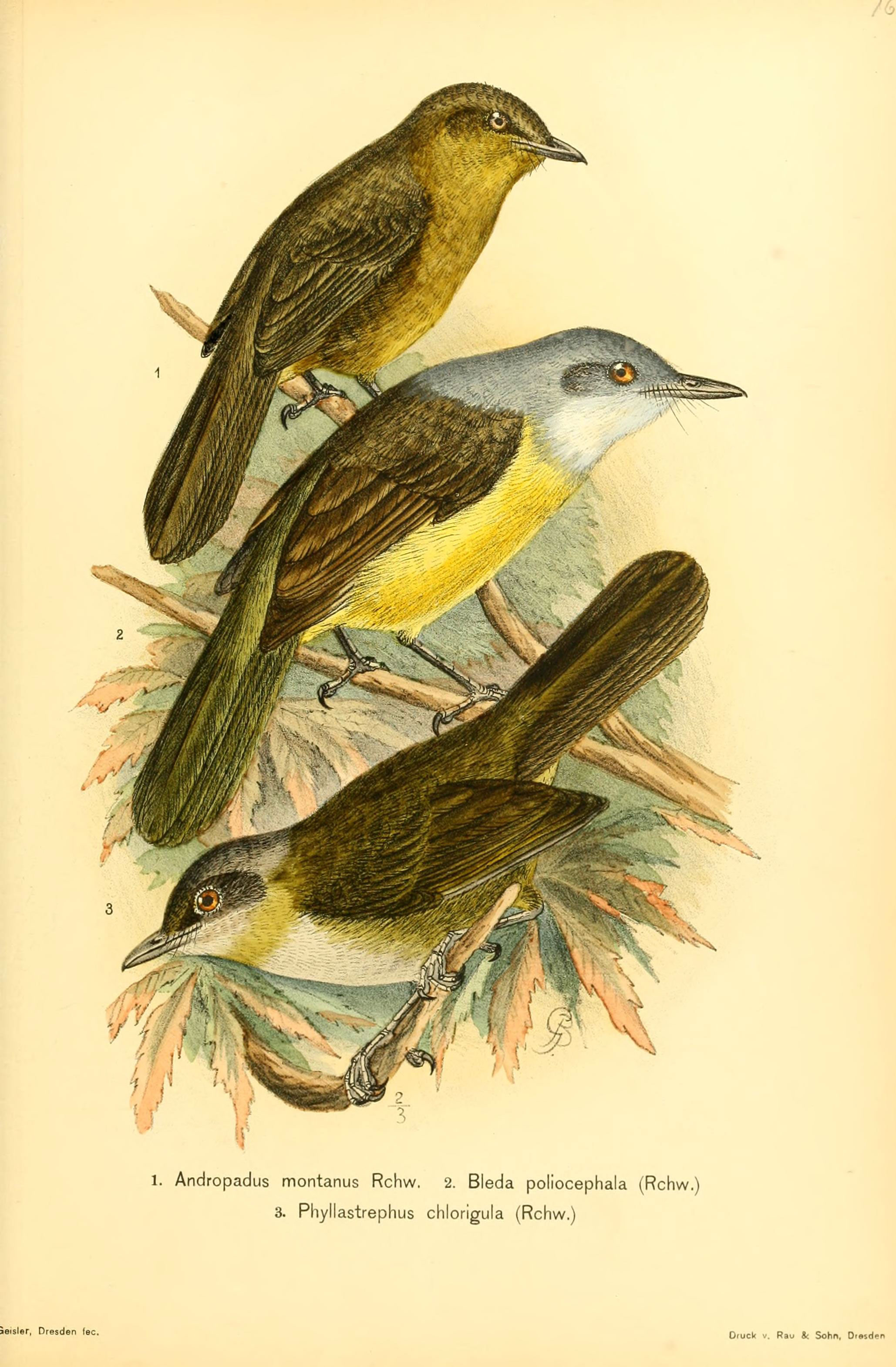

Conservation status
- Least Concern (IUCN 3.1)

Scientific classification
- Kingdom: Animalia
- Phylum: Chordata
- Class: Aves
- Order: Passeriformes
- Family: Pycnonotidae
- Genus: Phyllastrephus
- Species: P. poliocephalus

Binomial name
- Phyllastrephus poliocephalus (Reichenow, 1892)
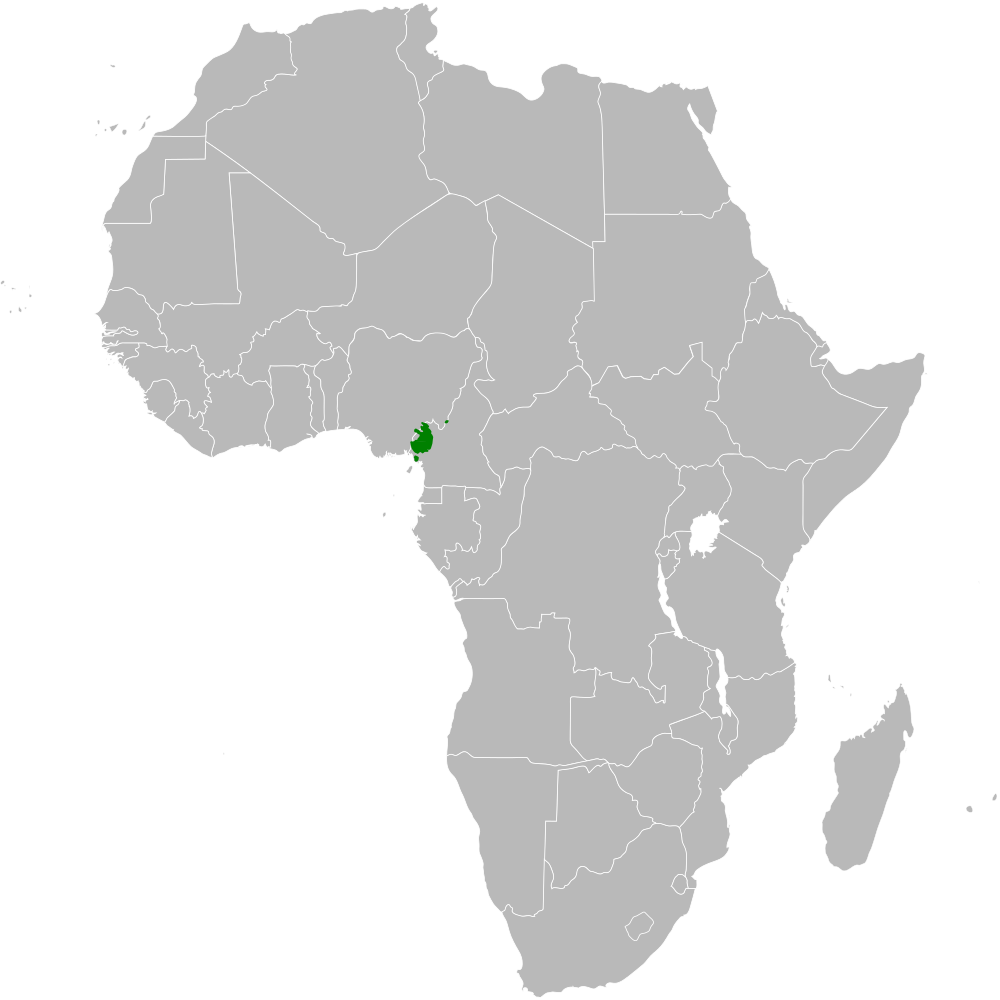

Synonyms
- Xenocichla poliocephala

= Grey-headed greenbul =

Species of songbird

The grey-headed greenbul (Phyllastrephus poliocephalus), or grey-headed yellow-bellied greenbul, is a species of songbird in the bulbul family, Pycnonotidae. It is native to the Western High Plateau.

Its natural habitats are subtropical or tropical moist lowland forests and subtropical or tropical moist montane forests. It is becoming rare due to habitat loss.

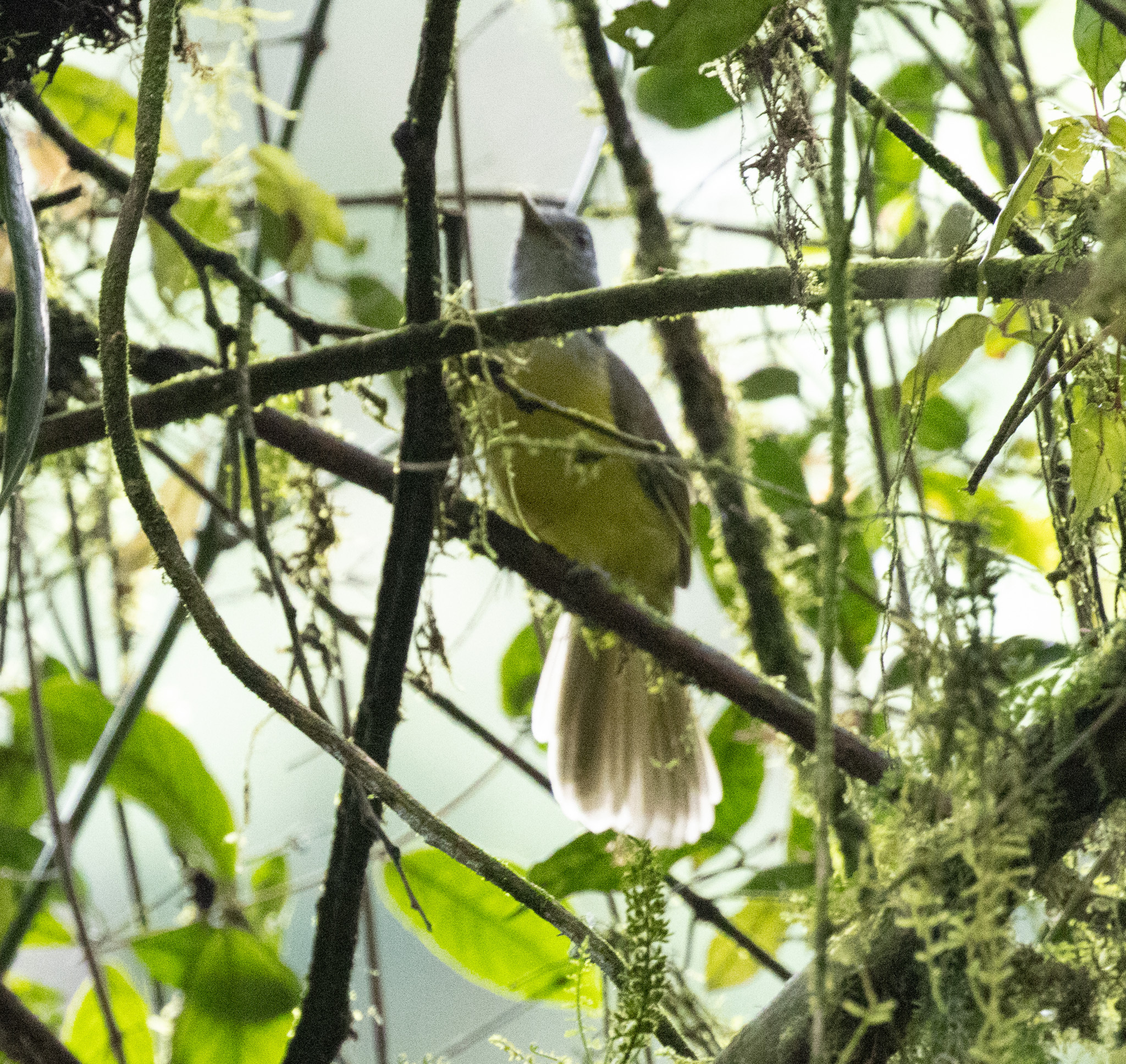
In Cameroon

== Taxonomy and systematics ==
The grey-headed greenbul was originally described in the genus Xenocichla (a synonym for Bleda). Other alternate names for the grey-headed greenbul include the yellow-bellied bulbul and yellow-bellied greenbul, although these names usually refer to the species of the same names (Alophoixus phaeocephalus and Chlorocichla flaviventris).
