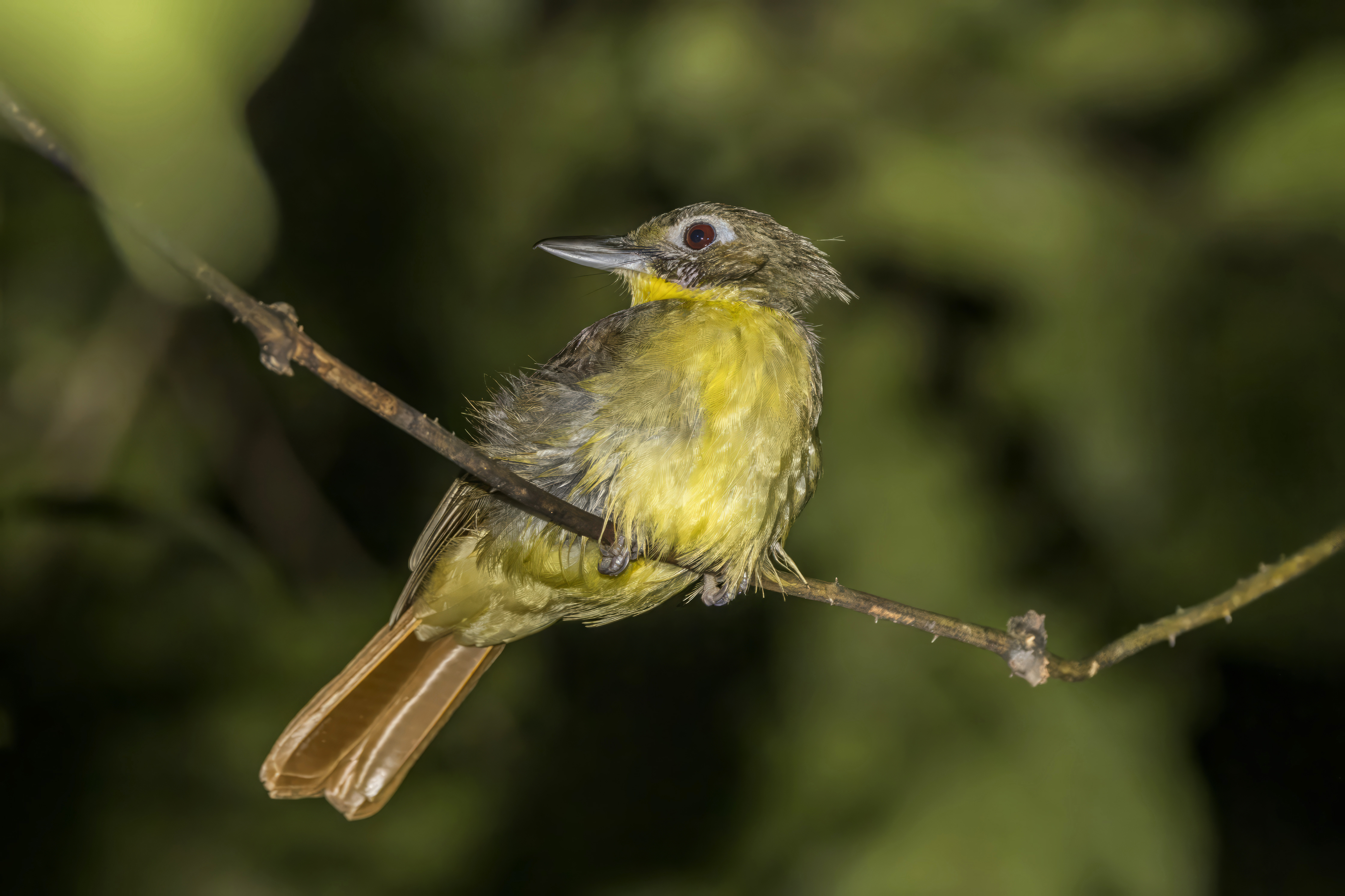
- Ankasa Forest Reserve, Ghana

Conservation status
- Least Concern (IUCN 3.1)

Scientific classification
- Kingdom: Animalia
- Phylum: Chordata
- Class: Aves
- Order: Passeriformes
- Family: Pycnonotidae
- Genus: Bleda
- Species: B. syndactylus

Binomial name
- Bleda syndactylus (Swainson, 1837)
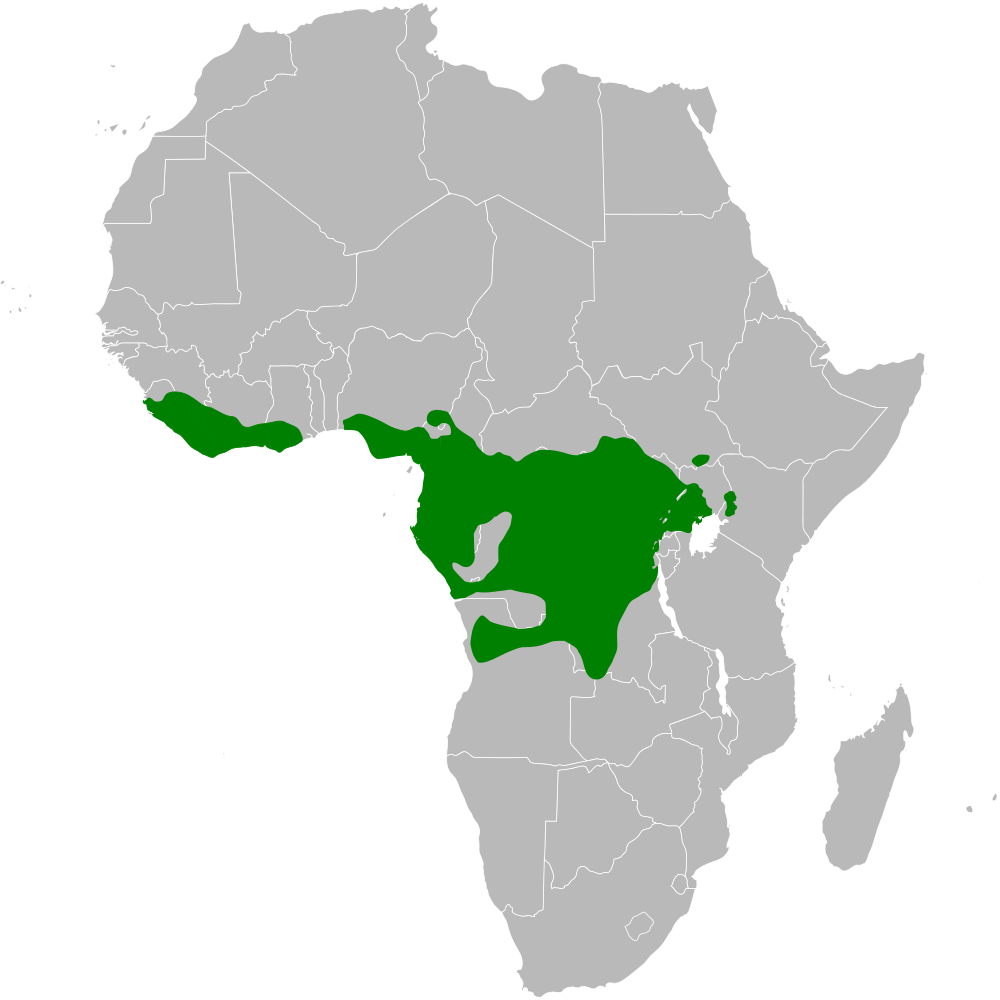

Synonyms
- Bleda syndactyla; Dasycephala syndactyla

= Red-tailed bristlebill =

Species of songbird

The red-tailed bristlebill (Bleda syndactylus) or common bristlebill, is a species of songbird in the bulbul family, Pycnonotidae. It is widely present throughout the African tropical rainforest. It prefers primary over secondary forests.

== Taxonomy and systematics ==
The red-tailed bristlebill was originally described in the genus Dasycephala (a synonym for Attila).

=== Subspecies ===
Two subspecies are recognized:

- Gabon bristlebill (B. s. syndactylus) - (Swainson, 1837): Found from Sierra Leone to western Democratic Republic of the Congo and northern Angola
- Uganda bristlebill (B. s. woosnami) - Ogilvie-Grant, 1907: Also named Bocage's bristlebill. Found from eastern Democratic Republic of the Congo to southern Sudan, western Kenya, north-western Zambia

== Diet ==
It is an ant follower.
