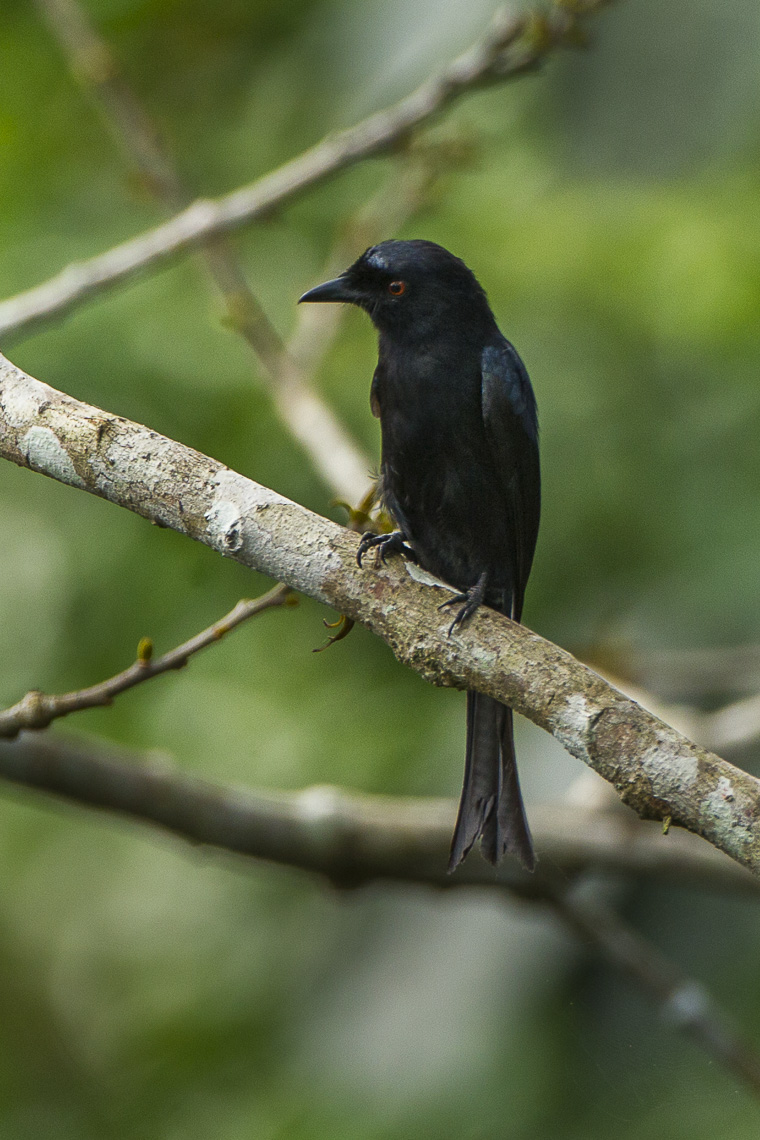

Conservation status
- Least Concern (IUCN 3.1)

Scientific classification
- Kingdom: Animalia
- Phylum: Chordata
- Class: Aves
- Order: Passeriformes
- Family: Dicruridae
- Genus: Dicrurus
- Species: D. modestus

Binomial name
- Dicrurus modestus Hartlaub, 1849

= Velvet-mantled drongo =

Species of bird

The velvet-mantled drongo (Dicrurus modestus) is a species of bird in the family Dicruridae. It is found throughout the Cameroon line and the African tropical rainforest.
