= Gabon batis =

Conservation status
- Least Concern (IUCN 3.1)

Scientific classification
- Kingdom: Animalia
- Phylum: Chordata
- Class: Aves
- Order: Passeriformes
- Family: Platysteiridae
- Genus: Batis
- Species: B. minima

Binomial name
- Batis minima (Verreaux & Verreaux, 1855)

Synonyms
- Platystira minima J. P. Verreaux and J. B. É. Verreaux, 1855

Species of bird

The Gabon batis (Batis minima) or Verreaux's batis, is a species of small bird in the family Platysteiridae. It occurs in the humid forests of western Central Africa.

== Description ==
The adult male has a velvety black head with a white loral spot and narrow supercilium, the head colour fades to blackish-grey on the hindcrown and is separated from the back by a white collar. The mantle and back are velvety-black with a mottled rump which has long, fluffy feathers. The wings are very black with a contrasting white wingstripe. The tail is black with white outer tail feathers. The underparts are white except for a glossy black breast band. The bill and legs are black and the eyes are golden yellow. The females is similar to the male but has a smaller loral spot and supercilium and has a narrower dark grey breast band. They are small birds measuring 9–10 cm (3.5–3.9 in) in length and weighing 8–12 g (0.28–0.42 oz).

=== Voice ===
The song is a series of high, evenly pitched thin short notes "pee-pee-pee-pee" which resembles a squeaky bicycle pump.

== Distribution and habitat ==
This species is very similar to the West African batis Batis occulta and this somewhat masks its true distribution but the Gabon batis has been found in Gabon, the Monte Alen National Park in Equatorial Guinea, the lowland Dja area in southern Cameroon and it has recently been discovered in the Dzanga-Ndoki National Park in the extreme south of the Central African Republic.

The Gabon batis is found in lowland forest, normally lower than 800 m (2,600 ft). It avoids primary rainforest, other than at the forest edge, and prefers secondary forest with a dense but broken canopy and thick, low undergrowth, as well as overgrown cacao and coffee plantations. It avoids cultivated land and the vicinity of villages and other man-made habitats.

== Habits ==
The habits of the Gabon batis are similar to those of other batises and it is territorial and usually seen either singly, in pairs or in small family groups. It is a restless but unobtrusive bird and patrols the whole of its 18-20 ha territory each day, the male taking the lead and singing his song, especially in the morning and late afternoon. This species and the West African batis regularly have hostile interactions which the Gabon batis reacts to by raising its crown feathers and flicking its wings and tail while moving from sided to side. In the hottest part of the day the Gabon batis has been known to sunbathe.

The Gabon batis is an arboreal forager, preferring to find food above heights of 5 m (16 ft) from the ground. It is attracted by flowering trees and prefers to forage in small leafed trees. Prey is gleaned from leaves by hovering beside the tree, or in flight or is disturbed by the moving bird and swooped on. The favoured prey is various insects between 5 and 15 mm (0.20 and 0.59 in) in length.

The breeding biology of the Gabon batis is little known but young have been observed during the rainy season following the short dry season, September and February in Gabon, and the young stay with their parents for an extended period. Solitary, probably dispersing immatures were seen in the long dry season in July and August.

== Conservation status ==
The Gabon batis is suspected to be experiencing a reduction in range and population as a result of forest clearance and degradation, however the rate of the suspected decline has not been estimated.

== Name ==
The alternative common name and Latin binomial commemorates the French naturalist Jules Verreaux.
