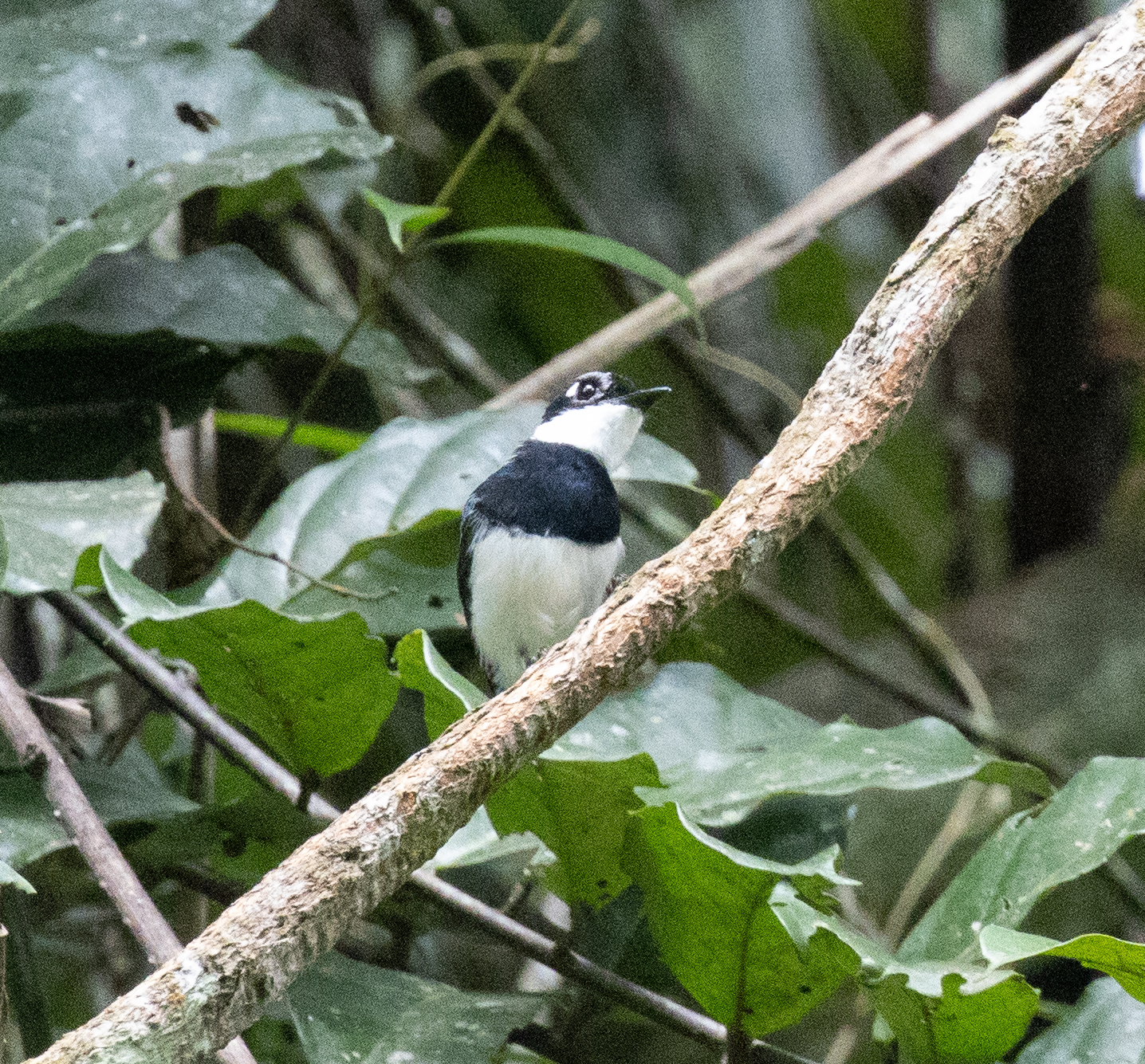

Conservation status
- Least Concern (IUCN 3.1)

Scientific classification
- Kingdom: Animalia
- Phylum: Chordata
- Class: Aves
- Order: Passeriformes
- Family: Platysteiridae
- Genus: Dyaphorophyia
- Species: D. tonsa

Binomial name
- Dyaphorophyia tonsa Bates, 1911

Synonyms
- Platysteira tonsa

= White-spotted wattle-eye =

Species of bird

The white-spotted wattle-eye (Dyaphorophyia tonsa) is a species of bird in the wattle-eye family Platysteiridae. It is found in Cameroon, Central African Republic, Republic of the Congo, Democratic Republic of the Congo, Ivory Coast, Equatorial Guinea, Gabon, and Nigeria. Its natural habitats are subtropical or tropical moist lowland forests and subtropical or tropical moist montane forests.
