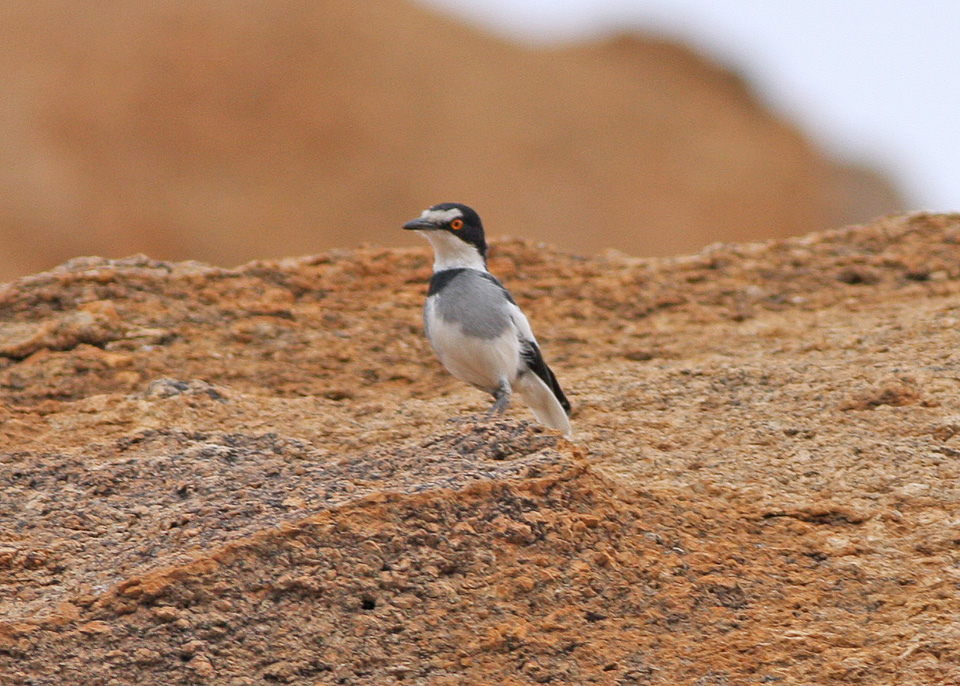

Conservation status
- Least Concern (IUCN 3.1)

Scientific classification
- Kingdom: Animalia
- Phylum: Chordata
- Class: Aves
- Order: Passeriformes
- Family: Platysteiridae
- Genus: Lanioturdus; Waterhouse, 1838
- Species: L. torquatus

Binomial name
- Lanioturdus torquatus Waterhouse, 1838

= White-tailed shrike =

Species of bird

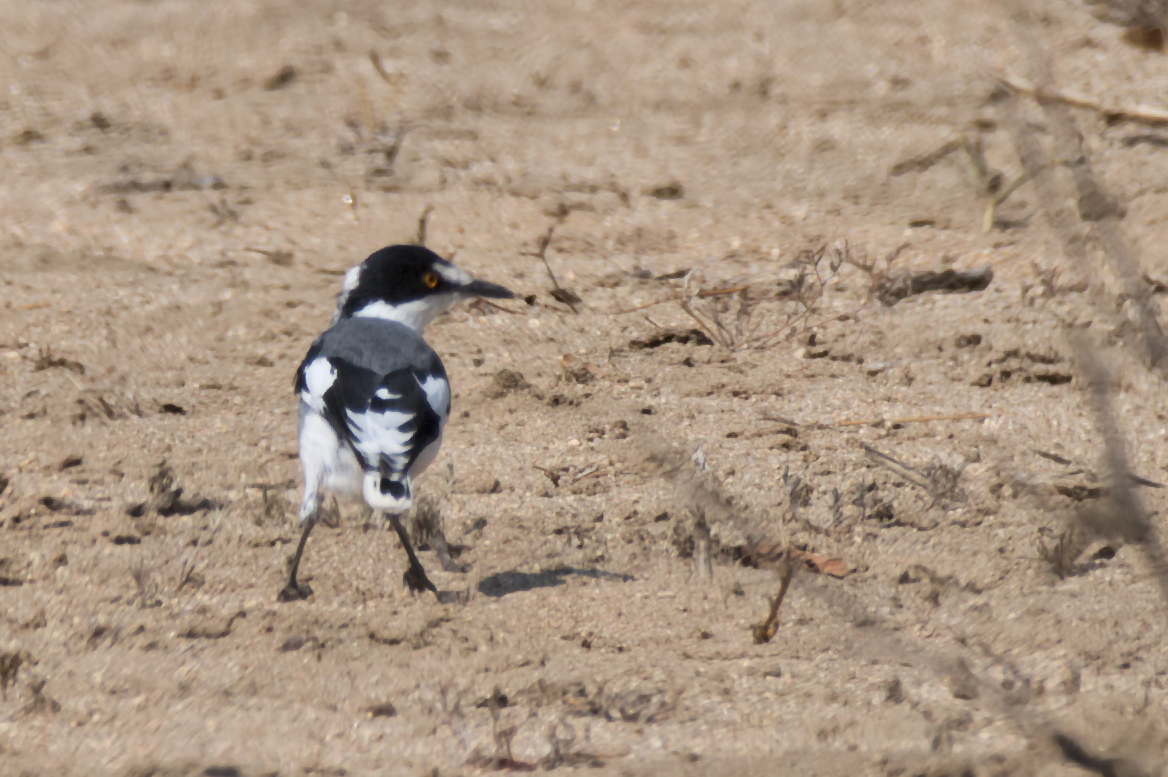
White-tailed Shrike

The white-tailed shrike (Lanioturdus torquatus) is a small passerine bird from the family Platysteiridae. It is also known as the chatshrike or ground batis. It occurs only in western Angola and Namibia in thorn scrub. It forages from ground level, where it hops about in large bounds and upright posture, to 25m above ground, scanning for insects. The very short tail, with a small black mark at the tip of the central two feathers, is always carried down, never sticking up. Its range of calls includes loud ringing territorial whistles.

This curious bird, which some consider to have close affinities with the batises and other bushshrikes, was discovered in 1837 by James Edward Alexander in the Naukluft Mountains of Namibia. Waterhouse subsequently described it in 1838, the name Lanioturdus ('shrike-thrush') reflecting the uncertainty of its classification, and torquatus denoting 'collared'. The sexes have a similar appearance.

It is a common, endemic, breeding resident in the region, small seasonal migrations taking place. Its favoured habitat is scrub-savanna, thornbush and mopane-veld. It is found singly or in pairs during the breeding season, and in small groups at other times. It is a clumsy flier with shallow and rapid wingbeats like other batises.

Nests are usually located in thorny acacias and are constructed by both sexes. Nests are deep, neat well-moulded cups incorporating spider-web and placed about 3 metres above ground. The usual clutch is 2-3 eggs pale-green to white with sparse reddish-brown spots. Only the female incubates the eggs.
