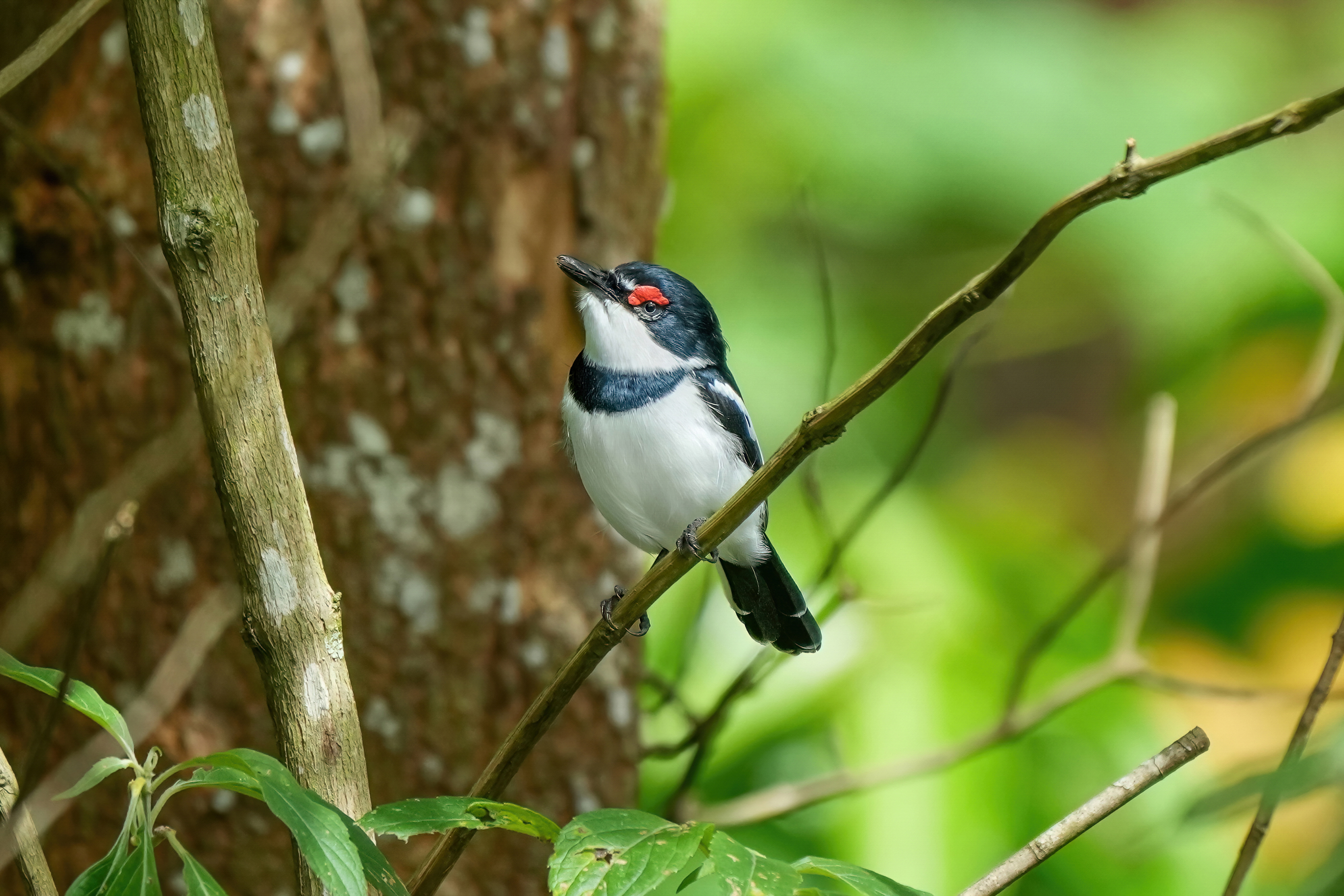
- Brown-throated wattle-eye (Platysteira cyanea)

Scientific classification
- Kingdom: Animalia
- Phylum: Chordata
- Class: Aves
- Order: Passeriformes
- Family: Platysteiridae
- Genus: Platysteira; Jardine & Selby, 1830

Type species
- Muscicapa melanoptera Gmelin, 1789

Species
- See text.

= Platysteira =

Genus of birds

Platysteira is a genus of birds in the wattle-eye family Platysteiridae that are found in tropical Africa.

== Taxonomy ==
The genus Platysteira was introduced in 1830 by the English naturalists William Jardine and Prideaux John Selby. The name combines the Ancient Greek πλατυς/platus meaning "broad" with στειρα/steira meaning "ship's keel". Jardine and Selby did not specify a type species but in 1840 the English zoologist George Gray designated the type as Muscicapa melanoptera Gmelin, 1789. This is a junior synonym of Muscicapa cyanea, Müller, PLS, 1776, the brown-throated wattle-eye.

The genus contains the following eight species:

Image	Common name	Scientific name	Distribution
	Brown-throated wattle-eye	Platysteira cyanea	West and central Africa.
	White-fronted wattle-eye	Platysteira albifrons	Lowlands and escarpment of western Angola and adjacent southwestern Democratic Republic of the Congo.
	Black-throated wattle-eye	Platysteira peltata	Central, east and southeast Africa.
	Banded wattle-eye	Platysteira laticincta	Bamenda Mountains (western Cameroon).
	Red-cheeked wattle-eye	Platysteira blissetti	Humid forest of Guinea and southern Sierra Leone to southern Cameroon.
	Black-necked wattle-eye	Platysteira chalybea	Humid forest of southern Cameroon and Gabon; Bioko.
	Jameson's wattle-eye	Platysteira jamesoni	Eastern Democratic Republic of the Congo, far southern South Sudan, Uganda, western Kenya, and far northwestern Tanzania.
	Yellow-bellied wattle-eye	Platysteira concreta	West and central Africa.
