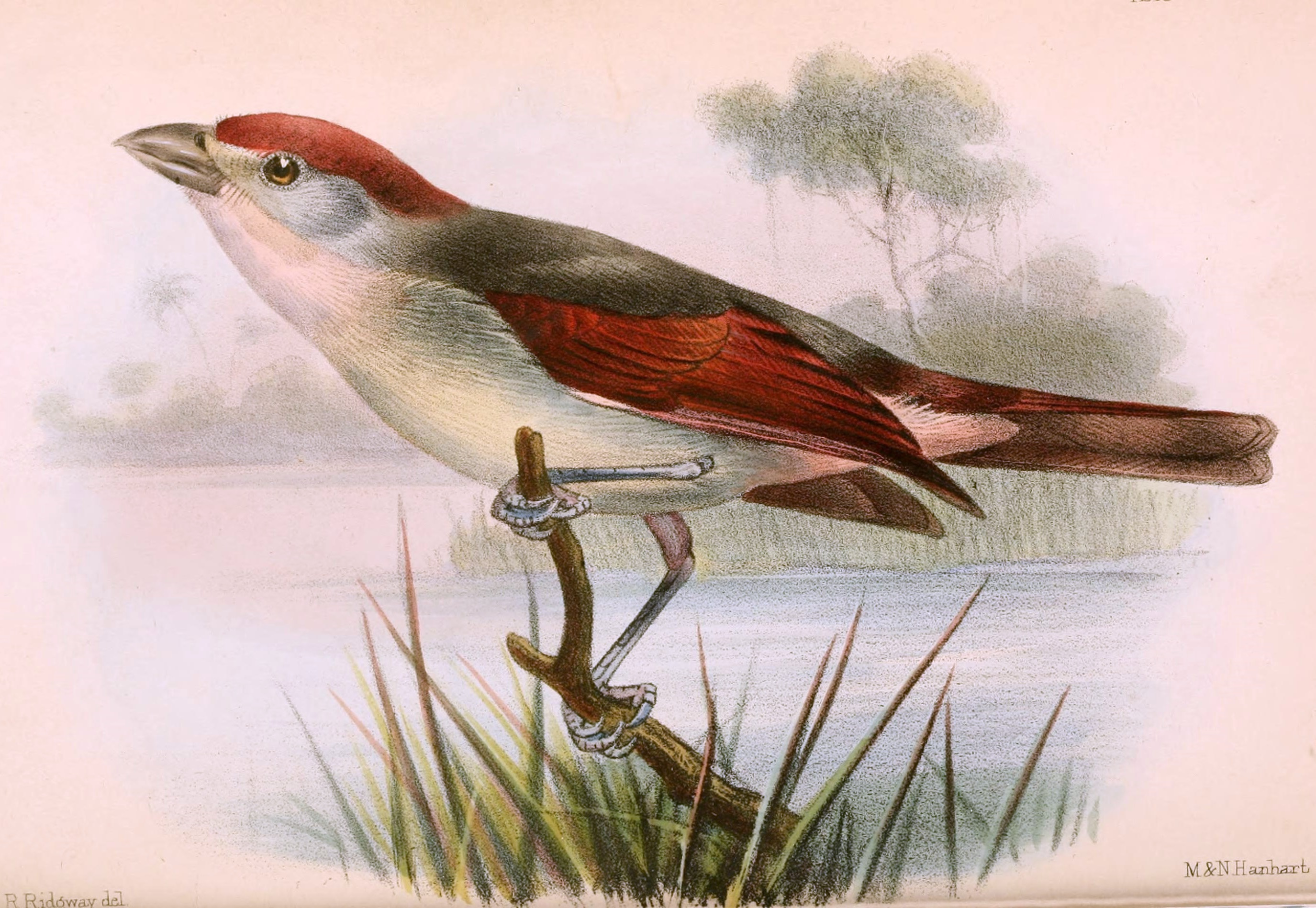

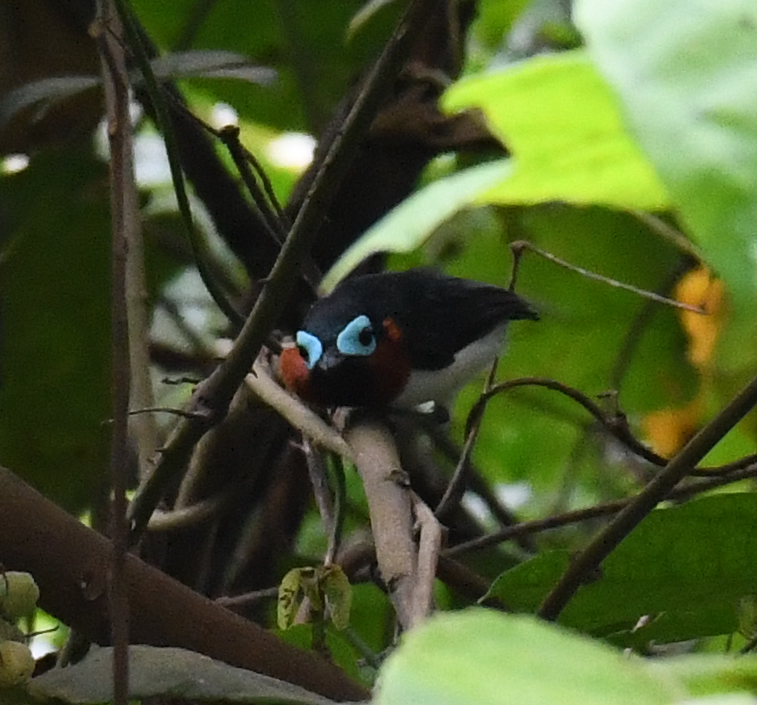

Conservation status
- Least Concern (IUCN 3.1)

Scientific classification
- Kingdom: Animalia
- Phylum: Chordata
- Class: Aves
- Order: Passeriformes
- Family: Platysteiridae
- Genus: Platysteira
- Species: P. blissetti

Binomial name
- Platysteira blissetti (Sharpe, 1872)

= Red-cheeked wattle-eye =

Species of bird

The red-cheeked wattle-eye (Platysteira blissetti) is a species of bird in the family Platysteiridae. It is found in Cameroon, Ivory Coast, Ghana, Guinea, Liberia, Nigeria, Sierra Leone, and Togo. Its natural habitat is subtropical or tropical moist lowland forests.
