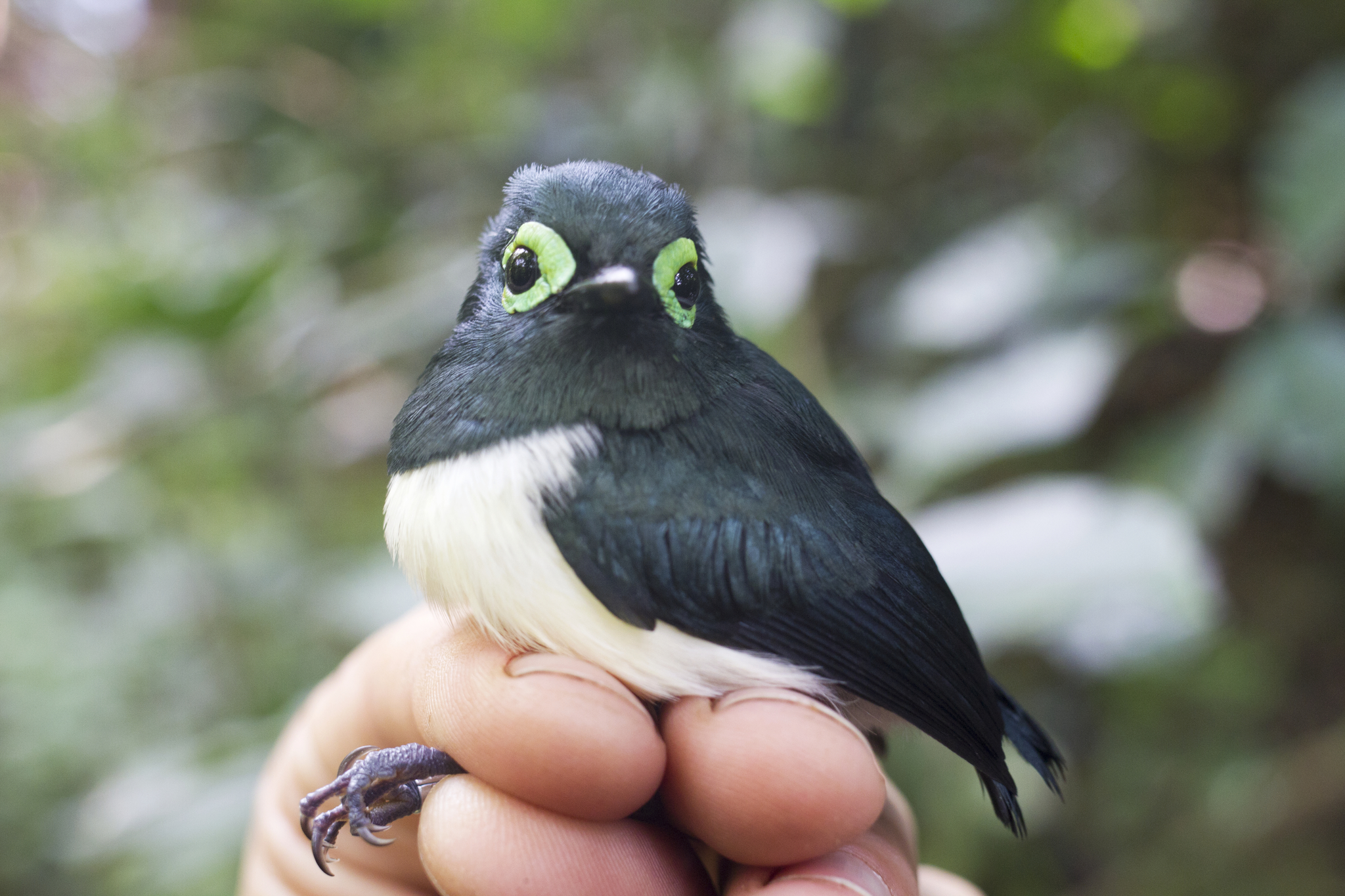

Conservation status
- Least Concern (IUCN 3.1)

Scientific classification
- Kingdom: Animalia
- Phylum: Chordata
- Class: Aves
- Order: Passeriformes
- Family: Platysteiridae
- Genus: Platysteira
- Species: P. chalybea

Binomial name
- Platysteira chalybea (Reichenow, 1897)

Synonyms
- Dyaphorophyia chalybea

= Black-necked wattle-eye =

Species of bird

The black-necked wattle-eye (Platysteira chalybea) is a species of bird in the family Platysteiridae. It is found in Angola, Cameroon, Equatorial Guinea, and Gabon. Its natural habitats are subtropical or tropical moist lowland forest, subtropical or tropical swamps, and subtropical or tropical moist montane forest.
