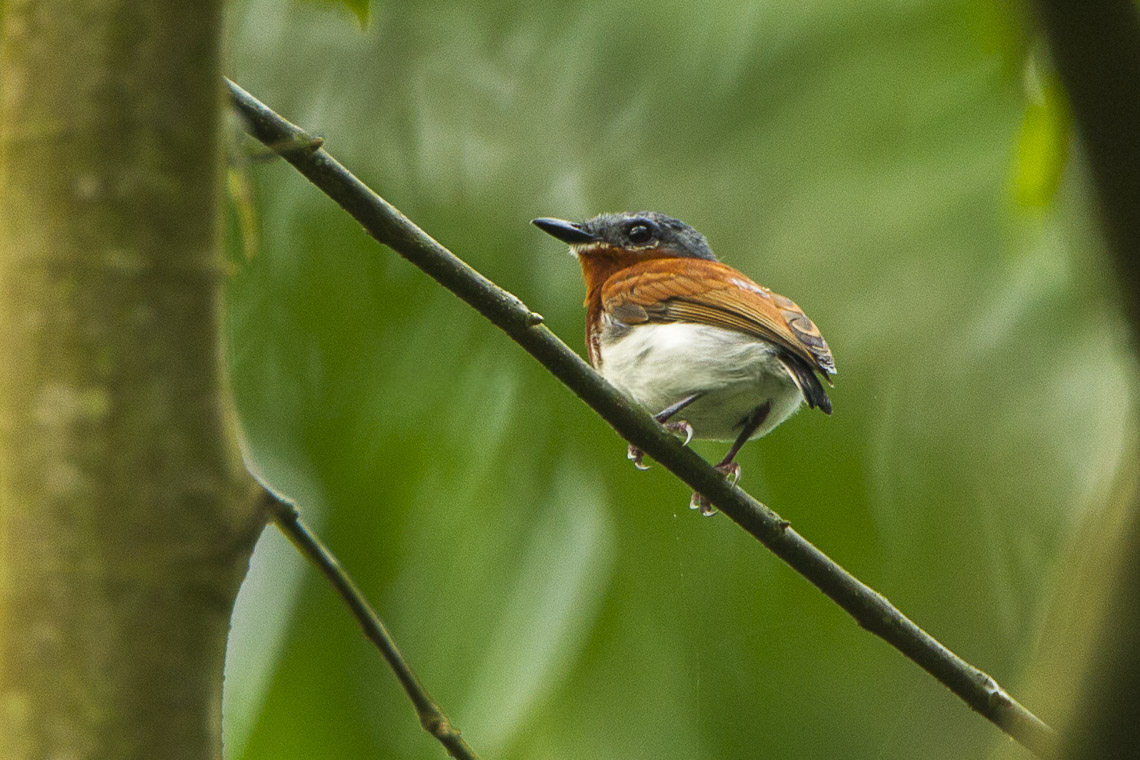

Conservation status
- Least Concern (IUCN 3.1)

Scientific classification
- Kingdom: Animalia
- Phylum: Chordata
- Class: Aves
- Order: Passeriformes
- Family: Platysteiridae
- Genus: Dyaphorophyia
- Species: D. hormophora

Binomial name
- Dyaphorophyia hormophora Reichenow, 1901

Synonyms
- Platysteira hormophora

= West African wattle-eye =

Species of bird

The West African wattle-eye (Dyaphorophyia hormophora) is a species of bird in the family Platysteiridae. It is found in Benin, Ivory Coast, Ghana, Guinea, Liberia, Sierra Leone, and Togo. Its natural habitats are subtropical or tropical moist lowland forests, subtropical or tropical swamps, and moist savanna.
