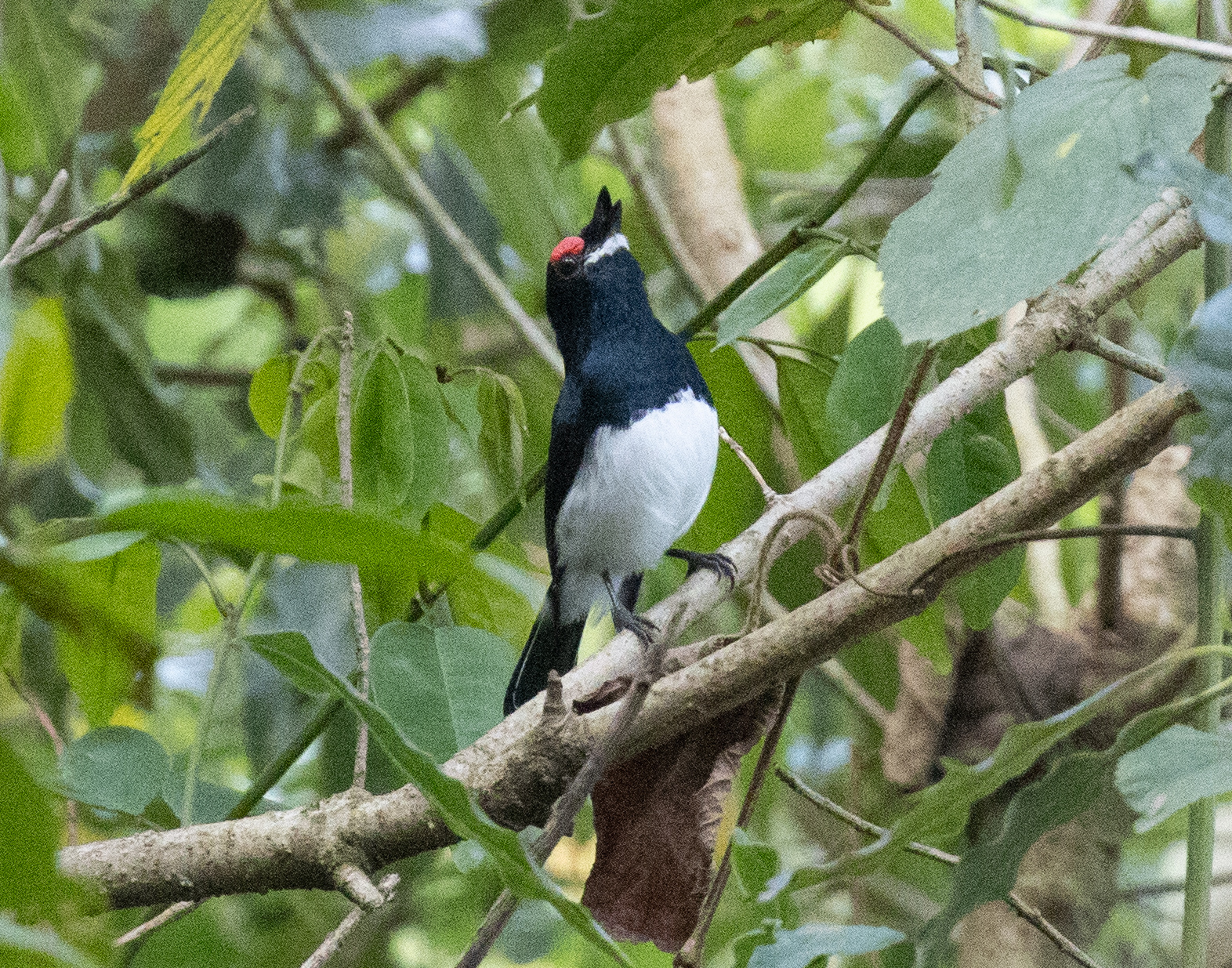

Conservation status
- Vulnerable (IUCN 3.1)

Scientific classification
- Kingdom: Animalia
- Phylum: Chordata
- Class: Aves
- Order: Passeriformes
- Family: Platysteiridae
- Genus: Platysteira
- Species: P. laticincta

Binomial name
- Platysteira laticincta Bates, 1926
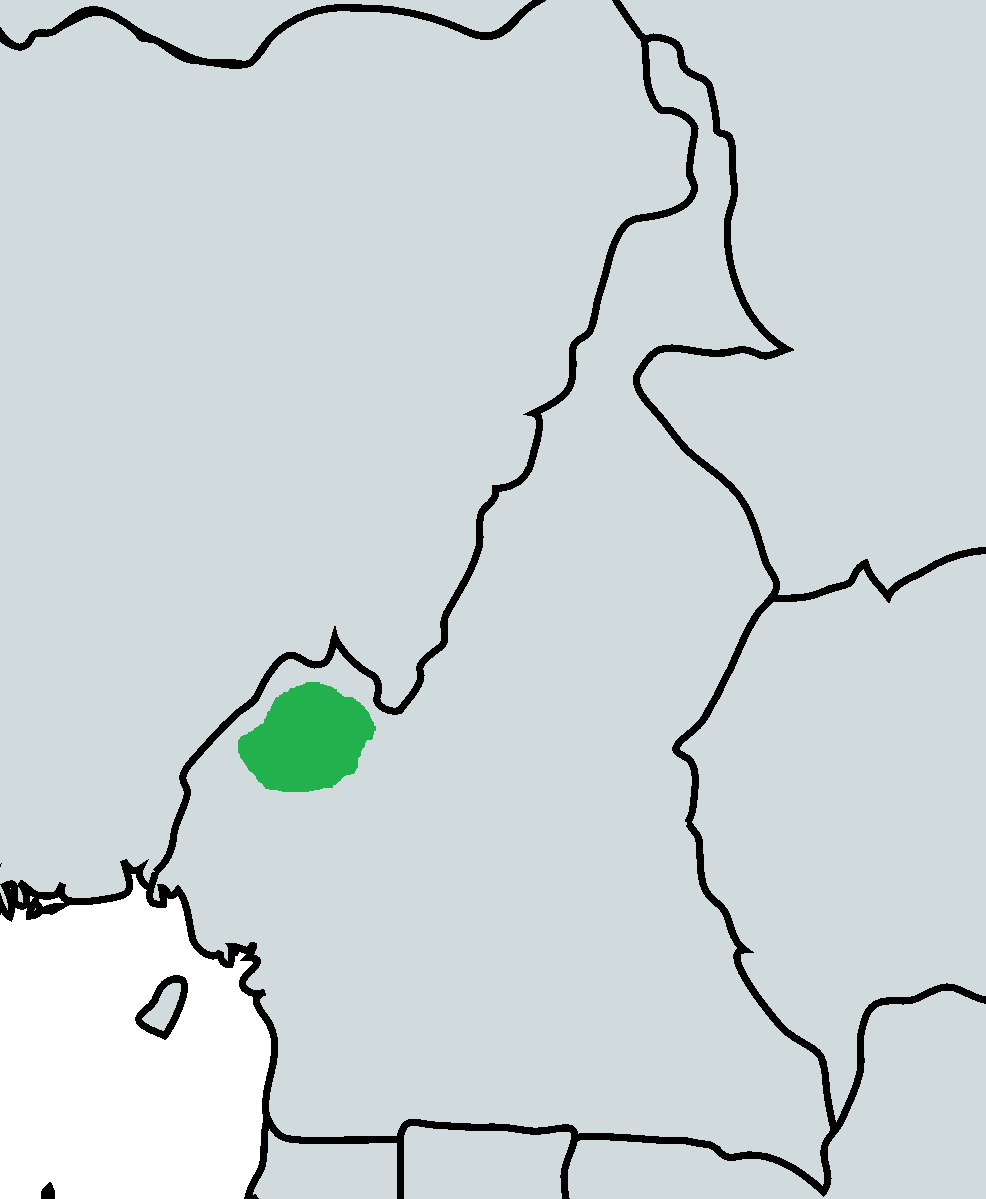

= Banded wattle-eye =

Species of bird

The banded wattle-eye (Platysteira laticincta) is a species of bird in the family Platysteiridae. It is endemic to the Bamenda Highlands in western Cameroon. Its natural habitat is subtropical or tropical moist montane forests. In particular, it likely prefers low-altitude forests with more bare ground and denser undergrowth cover.

It is threatened by habitat loss.
