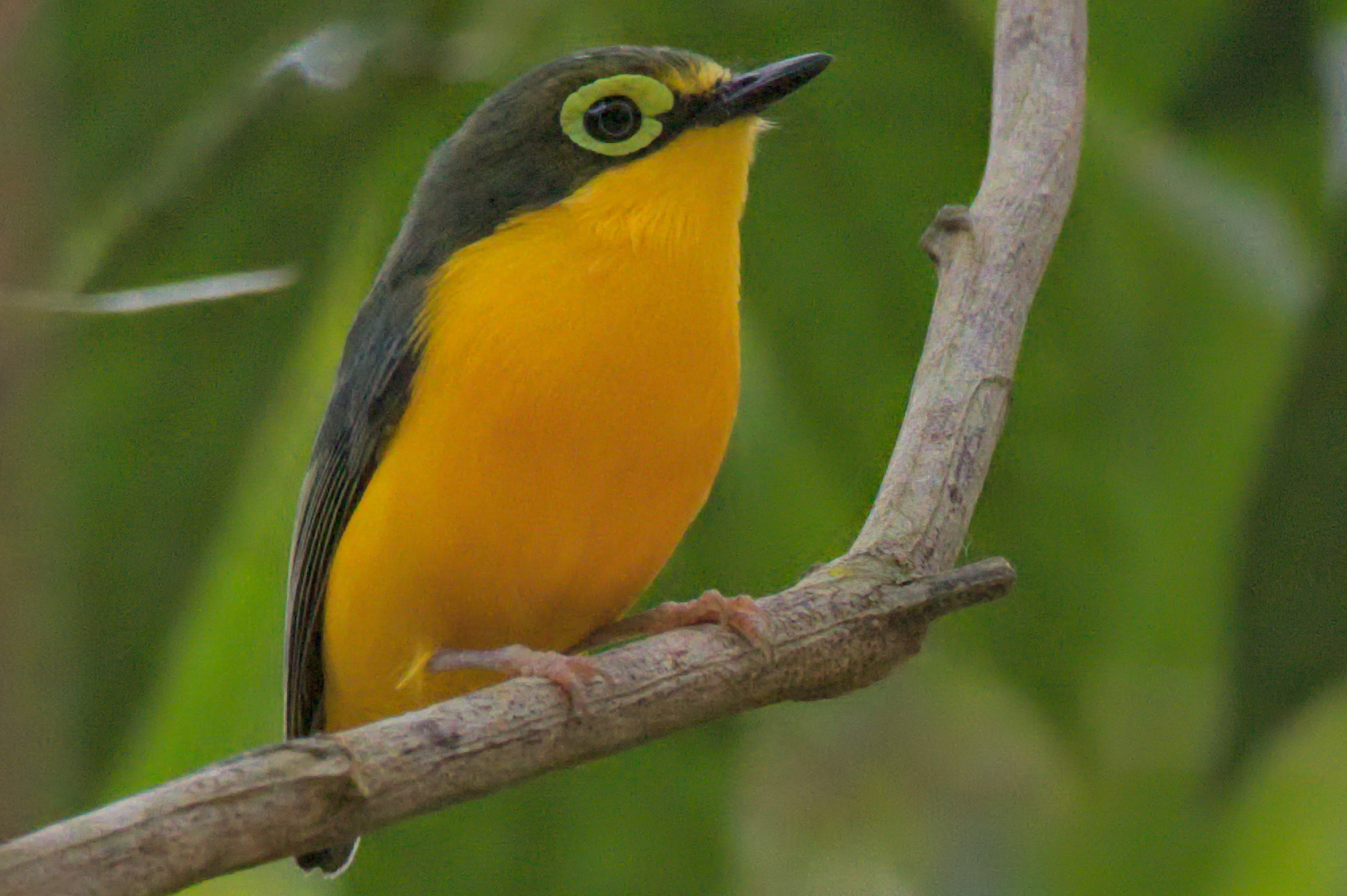

Conservation status
- Near Threatened (IUCN 3.1)

Scientific classification
- Kingdom: Animalia
- Phylum: Chordata
- Class: Aves
- Order: Passeriformes
- Family: Platysteiridae
- Genus: Platysteira
- Species: P. concreta

Binomial name
- Platysteira concreta Hartlaub, 1855

Synonyms
- Dyaphorophyia concreta

= Yellow-bellied wattle-eye =

Species of bird

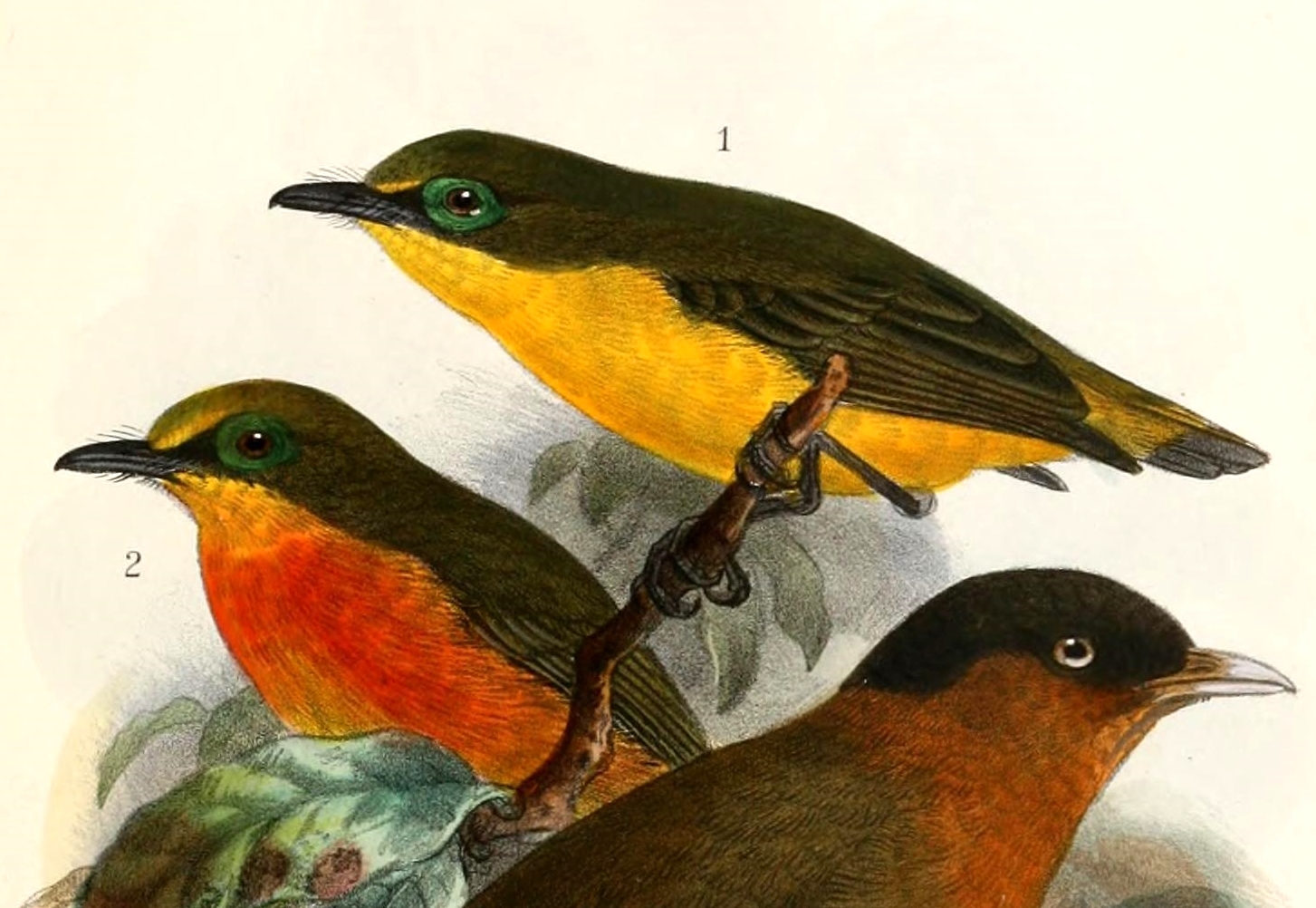

The yellow-bellied wattle-eye (Platysteira concreta) is a species of bird in the family Platysteiridae. It is sparsely distributed across the African tropical rainforest.
