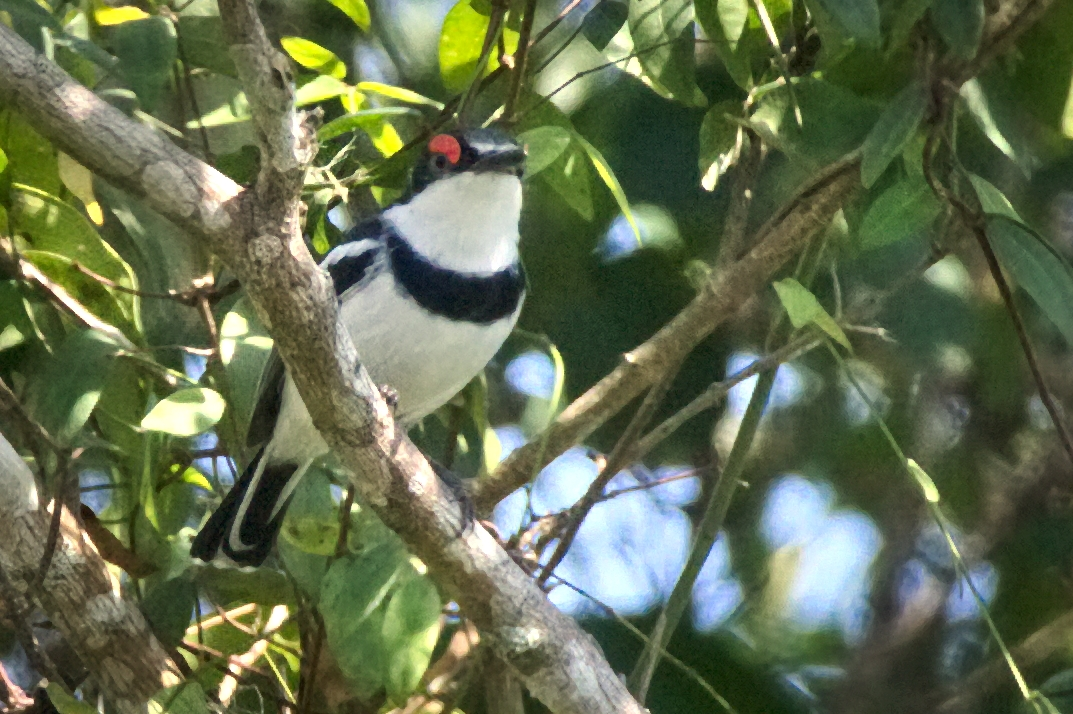

Conservation status
- Near Threatened (IUCN 3.1)

Scientific classification
- Kingdom: Animalia
- Phylum: Chordata
- Class: Aves
- Order: Passeriformes
- Family: Platysteiridae
- Genus: Platysteira
- Species: P. albifrons

Binomial name
- Platysteira albifrons Sharpe, 1873

= White-fronted wattle-eye =

Species of bird

The white-fronted wattle-eye (Platysteira albifrons) is a species of bird in the family Platysteiridae. It is endemic to Angola.

Its natural habitats are subtropical or tropical dry forests, subtropical or tropical mangrove forests, and subtropical or tropical dry shrubland. It is threatened by habitat loss.
