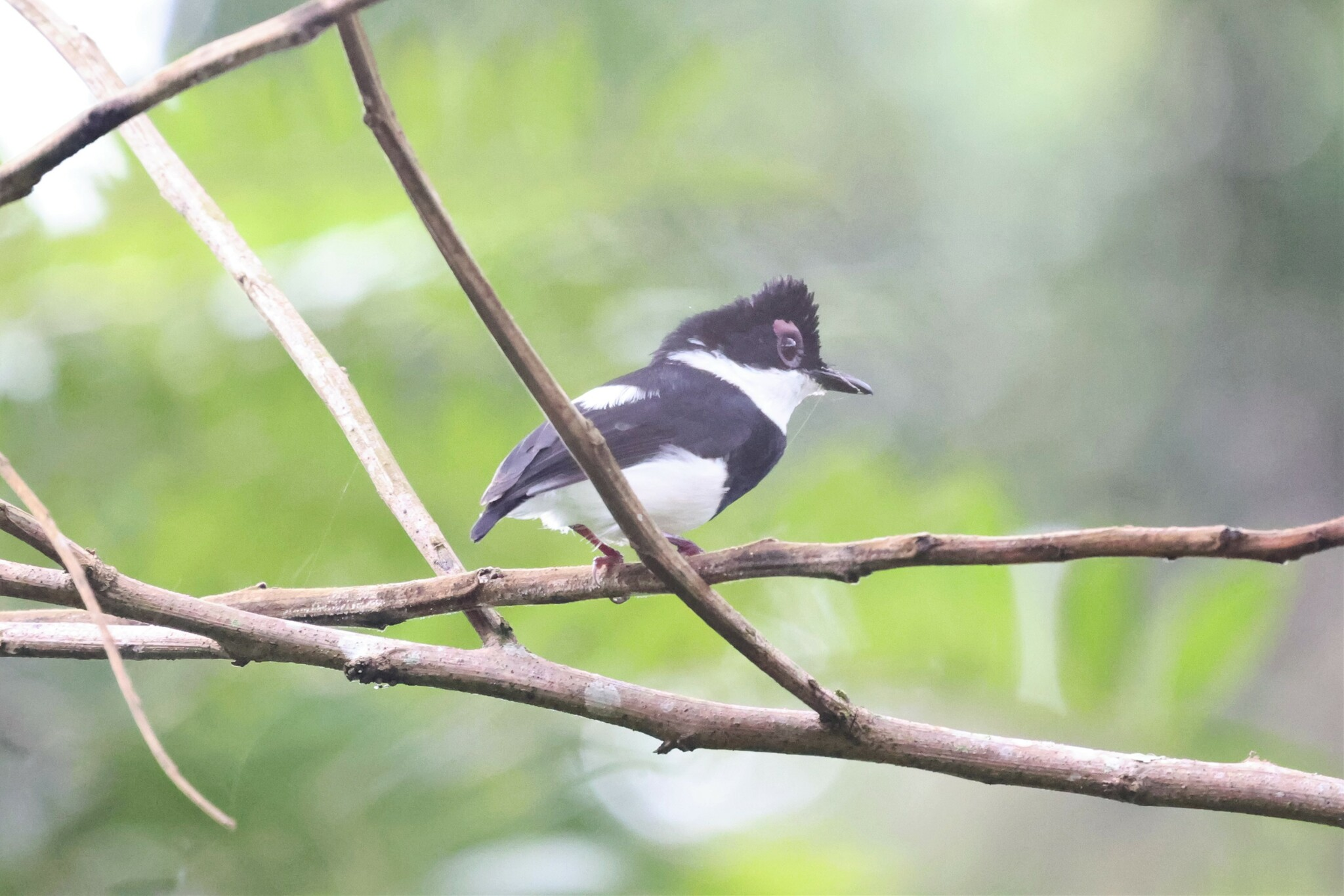
- Chestnut wattle-eye (Dyaphorophyia castanea)

Scientific classification
- Kingdom: Animalia
- Phylum: Chordata
- Class: Aves
- Order: Passeriformes
- Family: Platysteiridae
- Genus: Dyaphorophyia; Bonaparte, 1854

Type species
- Platysteira leucopygialis Fraser, 1843=Platysteira castanea Fraser, 1843

= Dyaphorophyia =

Genus of birds

Dyaphorophyia is a genus of birds in the wattle-eye family Platysteiridae. These insect-eating birds are found in tropical Africa.

== Taxonomy ==
The genus Dyaphorophyia was introduced in 1854 by the French naturalist Charles Lucien Bonaparte. He did not specify a type species but in 1855 George Gray designated the type as Platysteira leucopygialis Fraser. This is a junior synonym of Platysteira castanea Fraser, the chestnut wattle-eye. The genus name combines the Ancient Greek διαφορος/diaphoros meaning "different" with φυω/phuō meaning "to produce".

The genus contains the following three species:

Image	Common name	Scientific name	Distribution
	Chestnut wattle-eye	Dyaphorophyia castanea	Benin and southwestern Nigeria eastward to southeastern Sudan, western Kenya, and northwestern Tanzania, and southward to northwestern Angola, Democratic Republic of the Congo, and northwestern Zambia.
	West African wattle-eye	Dyaphorophyia hormophora	Sierra Leone to Togo.
	White-spotted wattle-eye	Dyaphorophyia tonsa	Forest of southern Ivory Coast to Nigeria, Gabon, and northern Democratic Republic of the Congo.
