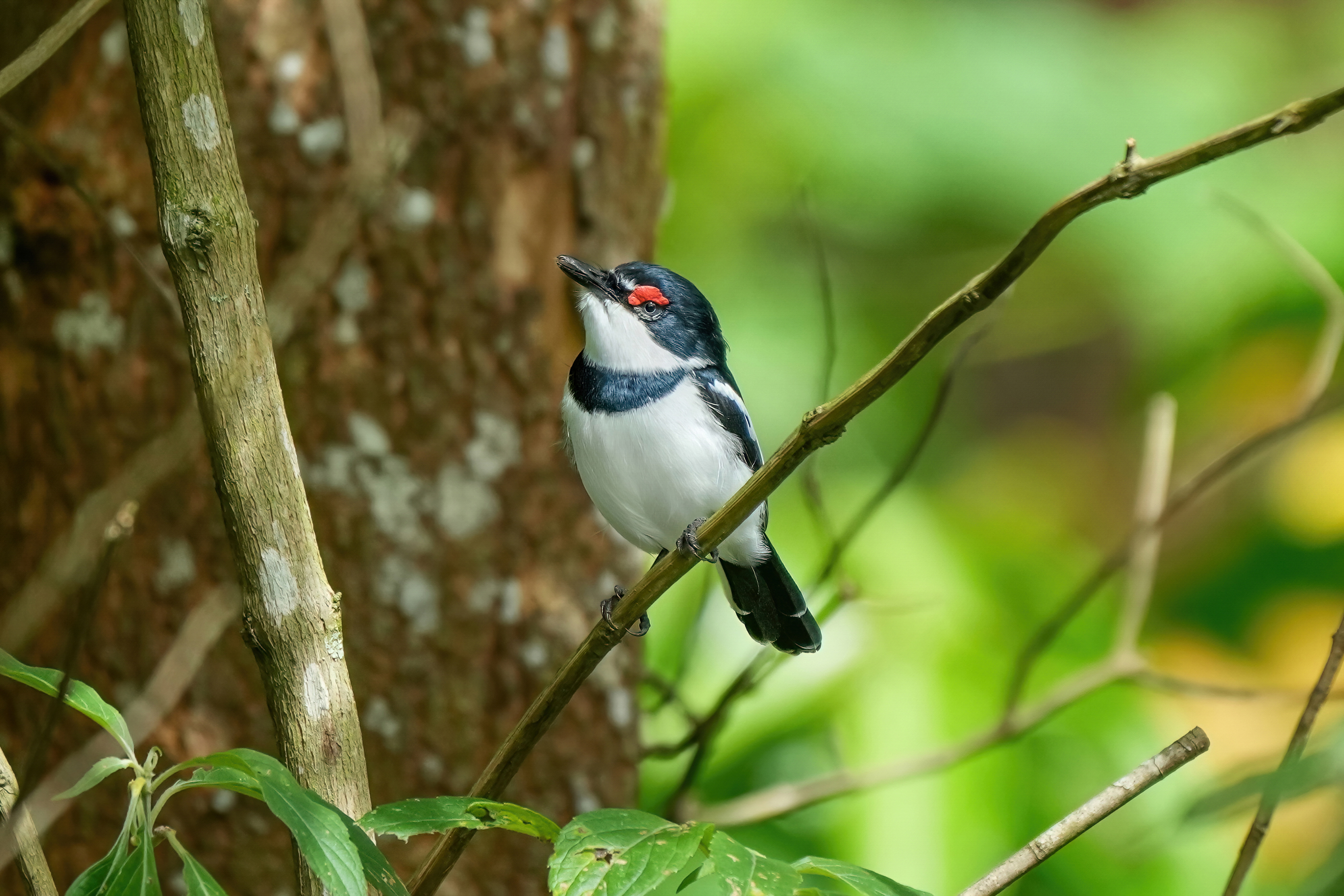

Conservation status
- Least Concern (IUCN 3.1)

Scientific classification
- Kingdom: Animalia
- Phylum: Chordata
- Class: Aves
- Order: Passeriformes
- Family: Platysteiridae
- Genus: Platysteira
- Species: P. cyanea

Binomial name
- Platysteira cyanea (Müller, 1776)

= Brown-throated wattle-eye =

Species of bird

The brown-throated wattle-eye (Platysteira cyanea), also known as the common wattle-eye or scarlet-spectacled wattle-eye, is a small, insectivorous passerine bird. The wattle-eyes were previously classed as a subfamily of the Old World flycatcher family Muscicapidae, but are now usually separated from that group.

This species breeds in west, central and northeast tropical Africa. This common species is found in secondary forest and other woodland areas, including gardens. The eggs are laid in a small neat lichen and cobweb cup low in a tree or bush.

The adult brown-throated wattle-eye is a stout bird about 14 cm (5.5 in) long. The breeding male has glossy black upperparts, and white underparts with a neat black breast band. There is a strong white wingbar, and fleshy red wattles above the eye.

The females are grey-black above, and also have the white wing bar and red wattles. There is a small patch of white below the bill, and the throat and breast are maroon, separated from the white belly by the black breast band. Young males are washed-out, greyer versions of the female.

These active insect-eating birds are found in pairs or small groups. The ringing call of the brown-throated wattle-eye is a very characteristic six note doo-dd-dum-di-do-do.

== Gallery ==
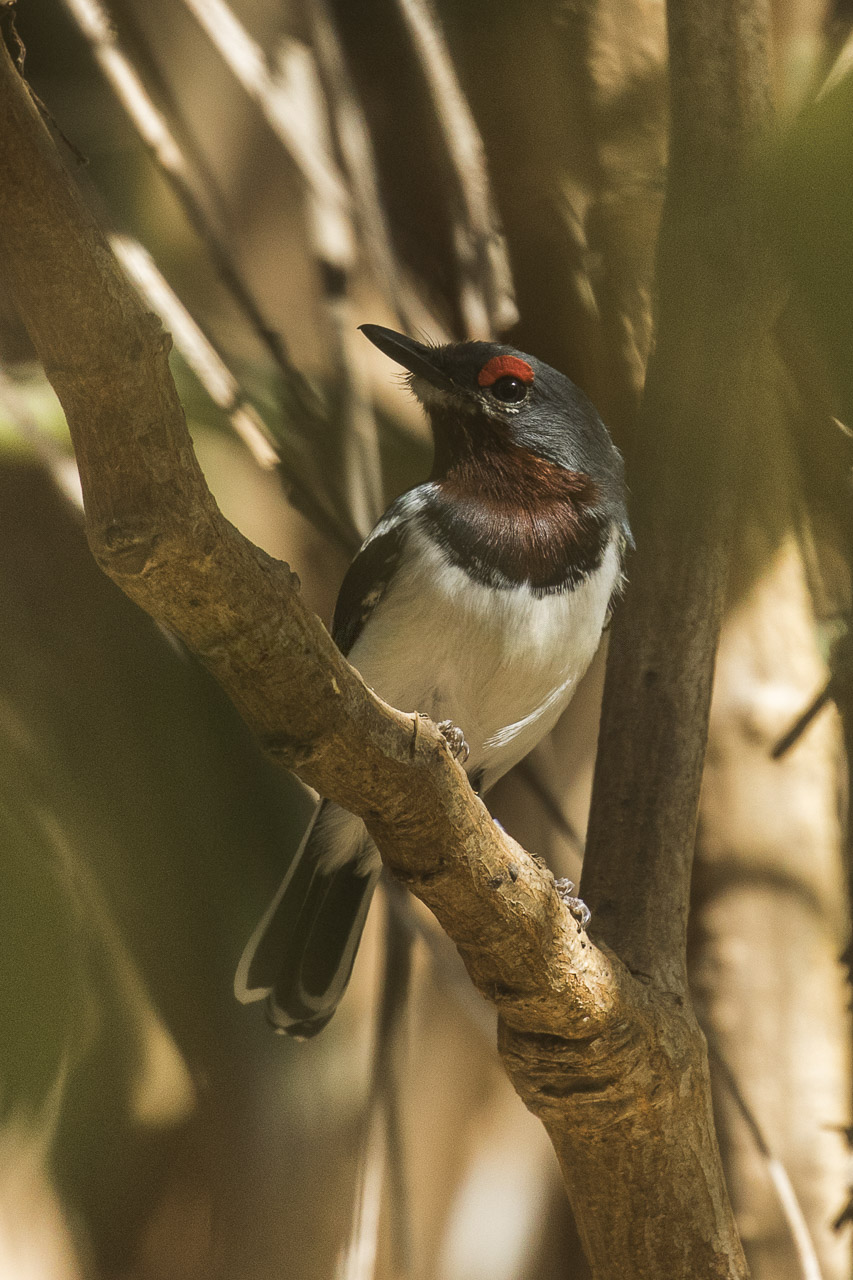
Brown-throated wattle-eye, Gambia

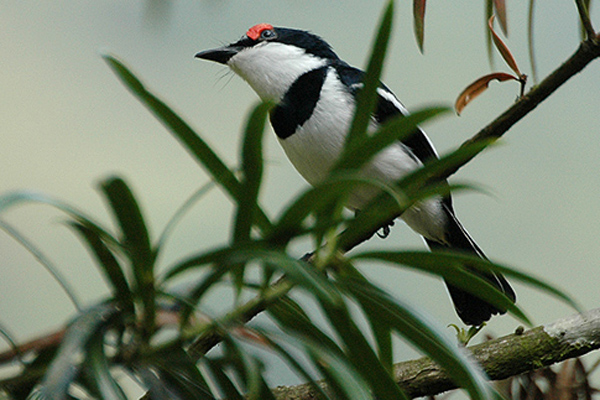
Male photographed at Bwindi, SW. Uganda

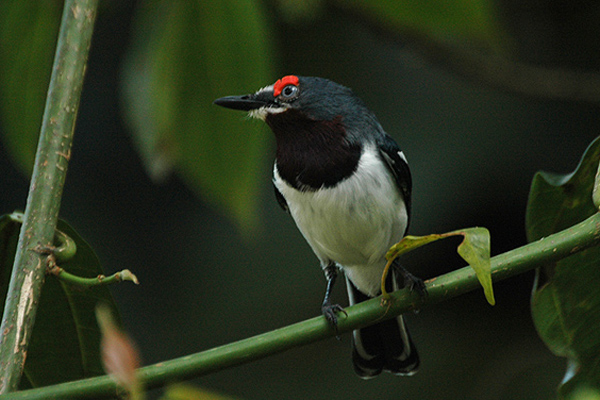
Female Common Wattle-eye (Platysteira cyanea), Uganda
