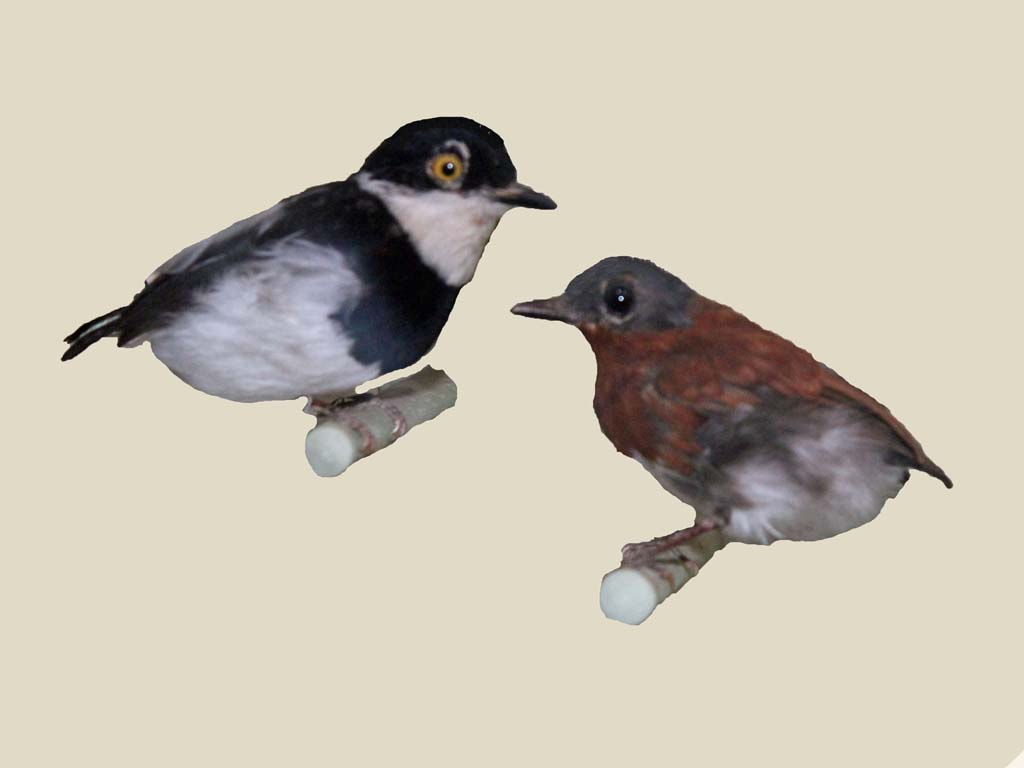
- Male specimen left, female right Nairobi National Museum

Conservation status
- Least Concern (IUCN 3.1)

Scientific classification
- Kingdom: Animalia
- Phylum: Chordata
- Class: Aves
- Order: Passeriformes
- Family: Platysteiridae
- Genus: Dyaphorophyia
- Species: D. castanea

Binomial name
- Dyaphorophyia castanea (Fraser, 1843)

Synonyms
- Platysteira castanea

= Chestnut wattle-eye =

Species of bird

The chestnut wattle-eye (Dyaphorophyia castanea) is a species of bird in the family Platysteiridae. It is widespread across Central Africa. Its natural habitats are subtropical or tropical moist lowland forest, subtropical or tropical swamps, and moist savanna. It is often found on cocoa farms.

== Gallery ==
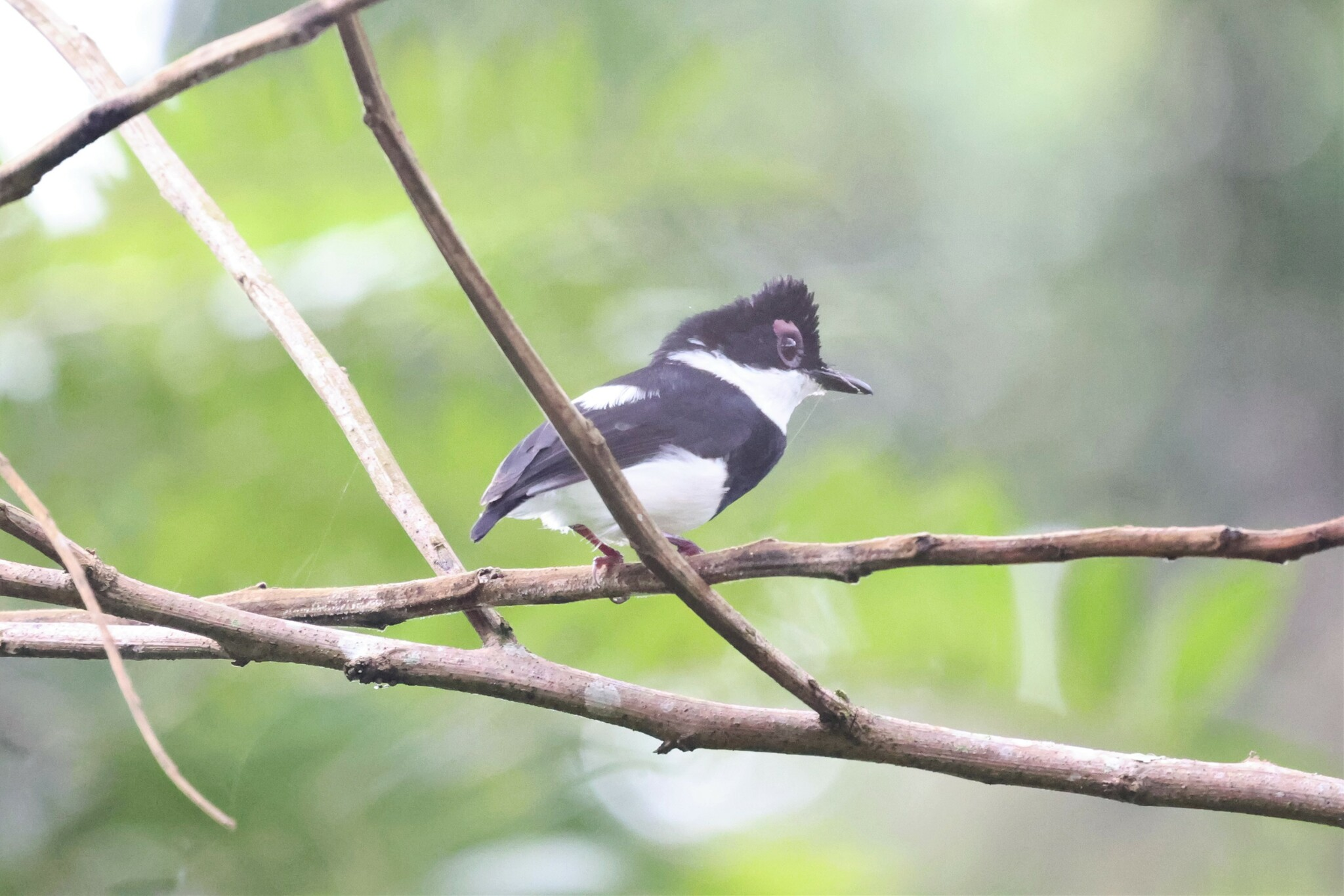
male

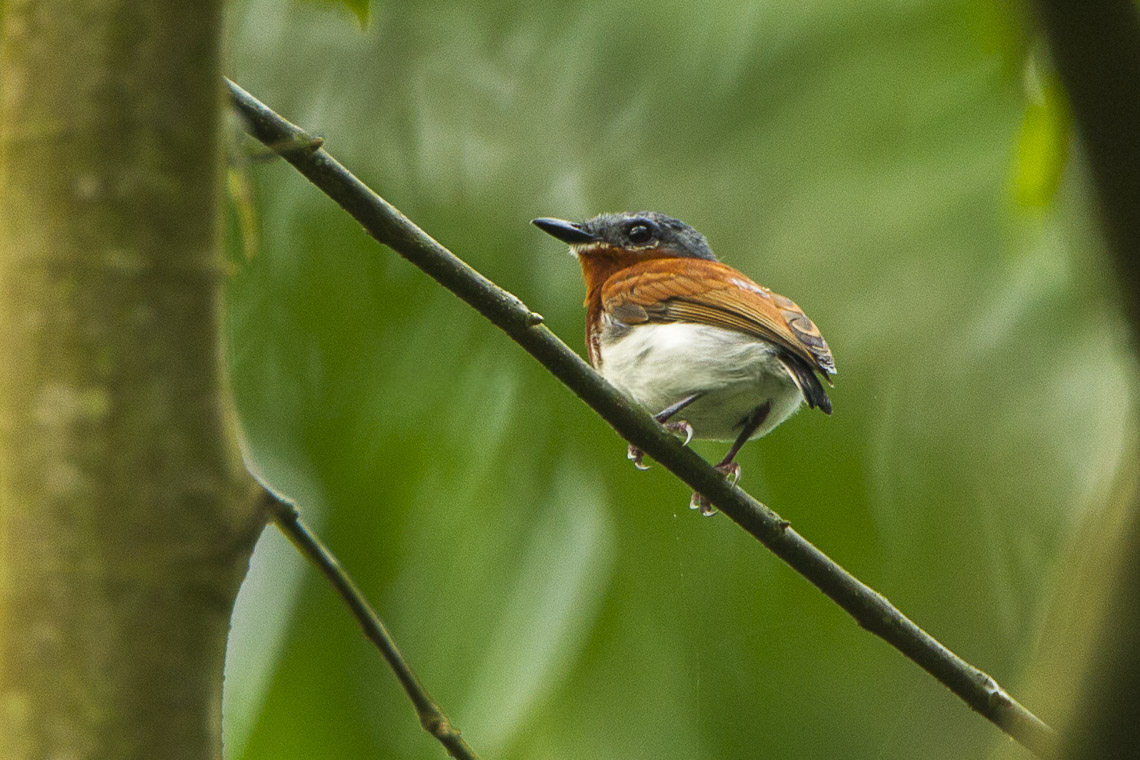
female
