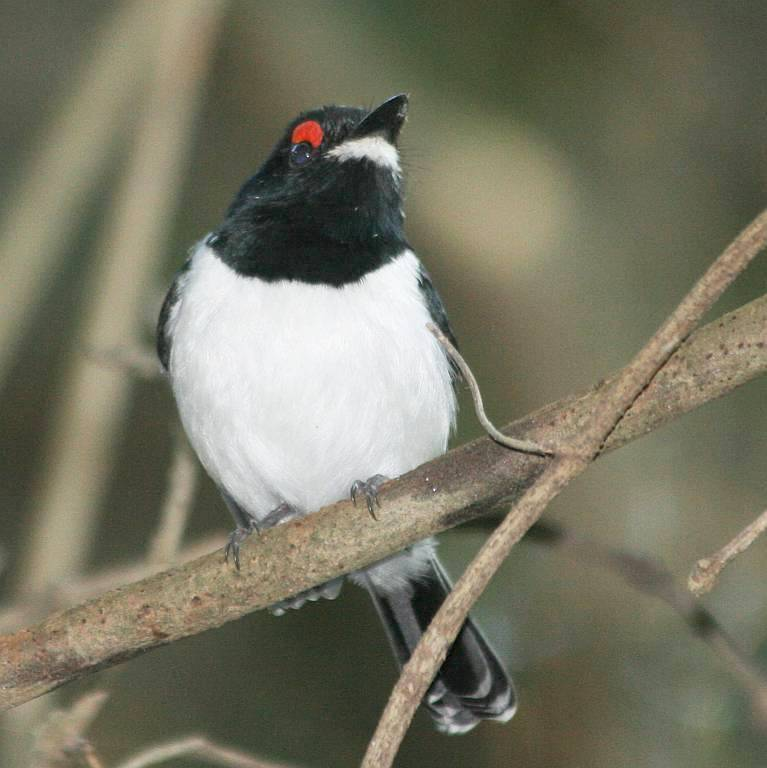
- Female, Umhlanga, KwaZulu-Natal, South Africa
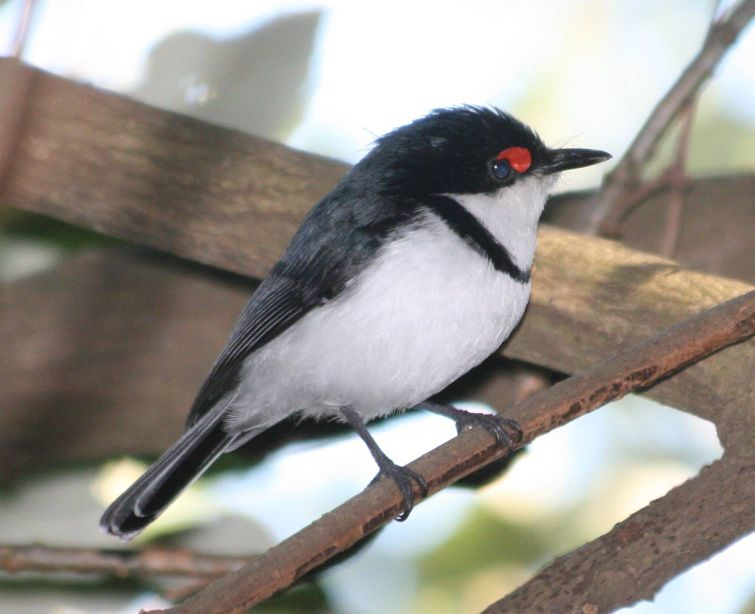
- Male, same location

Conservation status
- Least Concern (IUCN 3.1)

Scientific classification
- Kingdom: Animalia
- Phylum: Chordata
- Class: Aves
- Order: Passeriformes
- Family: Platysteiridae
- Genus: Platysteira
- Species: P. peltata

Binomial name
- Platysteira peltata Sundevall, 1850

= Black-throated wattle-eye =

Species of bird

The black-throated wattle-eye (Platysteira peltata) is a species of bird in the family Platysteiridae. It is found in Angola, Burundi, Democratic Republic of the Congo, Eswatini, Kenya, Malawi, Mozambique, Somalia, South Africa, Tanzania, Uganda, Zambia, and Zimbabwe.
