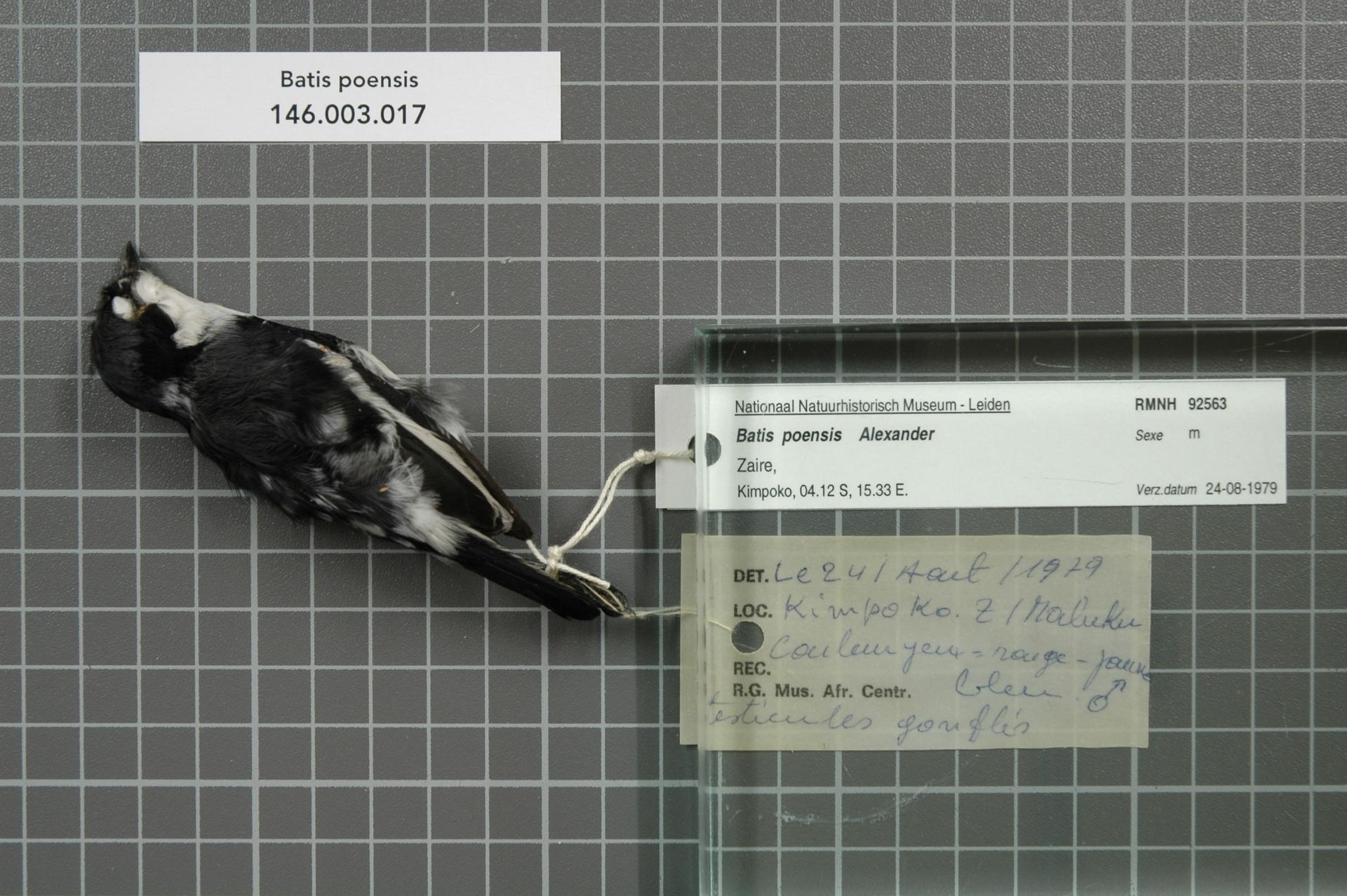
- bird skin specimen of Batis poensis

Conservation status
- Least Concern (IUCN 3.1)

Scientific classification
- Kingdom: Animalia
- Phylum: Chordata
- Class: Aves
- Order: Passeriformes
- Family: Platysteiridae
- Genus: Batis
- Species: B. poensis

Binomial name
- Batis poensis Alexander, 1903

= Fernando Po batis =

Species of bird

The Fernando Pó batis, also known as the Bioko batis, (Batis poensis) is a species of bird in the family Platysteiridae. It is endemic to the island of Bioko in Equatorial Guinea.

== Description ==
The Fernando Pó batis is small, restless flycatcher type bird with a mainly black and white plumage. The head and mantle are glossy blue-black with a small white loral spot, occasionally extending back to create a narrow supercilium. The back is blackish grey with small white spots on the rump and lower back. The wings are black with a white stripe, the tail is black with narrow white lines on the outer tail. The male has white underparts with a black breast band. Females are similar to males but are duller above with a chestnut rather than black breast band. Juveniles are similar to females but look dingier. They are 10.5 cm (4.1 in) long and weigh 8.8–9.4 g (0.31–0.33 oz).

== Distribution and habitat ==
Endemic to the island of Bioko, formerly known as Fernando Pó, where it inhabits the lowland forest up to the ecotone with the montane forest, at 1,350 m (4,430 ft).

== Habits ==
The Fernando Pó batis is restless and shy, highly arboreal and forages within the canopy of tall trees. It forages for insects by gleaning foliage, by flycatching or by picking prey off leaves while briefly hovering. Large insects with hard exoskeletons are rubbed and hit against a branch before being dismembered. It will join other species in mixed foraging flocks. Little is known about the breeding biology but fledged juveniles have been seen in October. The nest is built in the outer fork of a branch by both birds in the pair, using bark strips and fibres.

== Taxonomy ==
The Fernando Pó batis is some times lumped with the West African batis (Batis occulta), but both are now considered distinct species.
