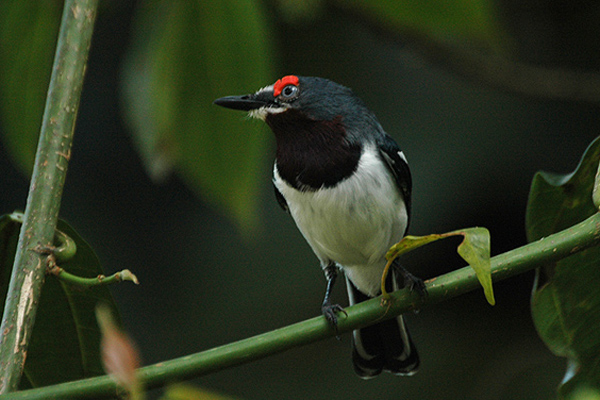
- Brown-throated wattle-eye

Scientific classification
- Kingdom: Animalia
- Phylum: Chordata
- Class: Aves
- Order: Passeriformes
- Superfamily: Malaconotoidea
- Family: Platysteiridae; Sundevall, 1872

Genera
- Platysteira; Dyaphorophyia; Batis; Lanioturdus

= Wattle-eye =

Wattle-eyes and batises

Family of birds

Platysteiridae is a family of small, stout passerine birds of the African tropics. The family contains the wattle-eyes and batises. They were previously classed as a subfamily of the Old World flycatchers, Muscicapidae. These insect-eating birds are usually found in open forests or bush. They hunt by flycatching, or by taking prey from the ground like a shrike. The nest is a small, neat cup, placed low in a tree or bush.

== Distribution and habitat ==
The Platysteiridae are arboreal birds, primarily of the woodlands and forests of sub-Saharan Africa. The family is restricted to mainland Africa and its offshore islands. The genus Dyaphorophyia are inhabitants of dense forest, while the rest of the wattle-eyes are found in woodland, and the batises range across all wooded habitats except the densest forests of the Congo Basin. The pririt and pygmy batis survive in very arid environments with some cover, and the white-fronted wattle-eye favours mangrove forests in Angola. Many species in the family have adapted to human-altered habitats. The family has its highest diversity at equatorial latitudes, with half the known species native to Tanzania and almost half also ranging into the DRC and Kenya.

The family is overwhelmingly sedentary, however some batis species undertake seasonal migrations, along with some local movements in response to changing local conditions.

== Morphology ==
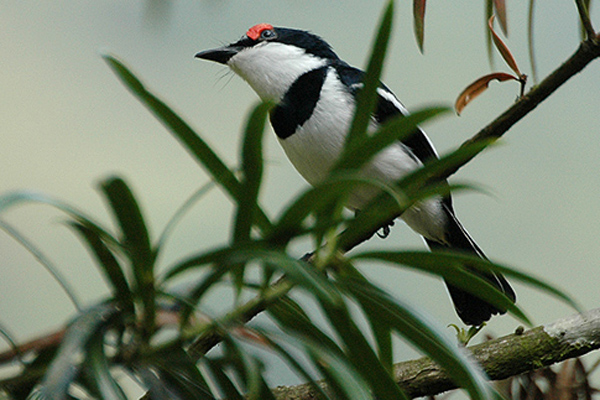
The wattles above the eyes of this common wattle-eye are used in communication

The Platysteiridae are small to medium-sized passerines. They have short legs and an upright stance while perched. The tail length is variable, with the Dyaphorophyia wattle-eyes and batises having short tails and the Platysteria wattle-eyes and shrike-flycatchers possessing longish tails. The bill is flat and hooked at the tip, and generally wide with well-developed rictal bristles. With the exception of a few batises, the plumage of the family is sexually dimorphic. Overall the family has white undersides and dark, speckled upperparts, with many species sporting a band across the chest. A few wattle-eyes depart from this pattern and possess brightly coloured plumage. The plumage on the back of some genera are erectile, giving the family the alternative name of puffback flycatchers. The irides of batises and the black-and-white shrike-flycatcher are brightly coloured and used in communication, becoming more brightly coloured when the adults are excited. In the wattle-eyes the supra-orbital wattles above the eyes, for which they are named, are used in communication. In addition the family is highly vocal, with a repertoire that includes a range of whistles, harsh calls and duets.

== Diet ==
The most important component in the diet of all species is insects, although spiders, millipedes and scorpions are also taken, and there are even records of small lizards being consumed. Amongst the insect prey, a number of different types are eaten: beetles, grasshoppers and other Orthoptera, flies, mosquitoes, wasps, termites, mantises and others. Members of this family forage either individually or in family groups. Some species will also join mixed species feeding flocks, which confers some foraging advantages. The different species and genera use a variety of methods to obtain prey, ranging from foliage-gleaning to flycatching.

== Conservation and threats ==
One species, the banded wattle-eye, is considered threatened by human activities. The species has a restricted range in Cameroon which is vulnerable to forest clearance, and it is listed as endangered by the IUCN. Two other species are considered near-threatened, the Gabon batis and the white-fronted wattle-eye; both species are threatened by habitat loss. Some species are also very poorly known, and one species, the dark batis, was only identified as a species in 2006.

== Platysteiridae ==
The family contains 32 species in 4 genera:

- Genus Lanioturdus
  - White-tailed shrike, Lanioturdus torquatus, is usually considered to be part of the family, sometimes considered belonging with bushshrikes (Malaconotidae).
- Genus Dyaphorophyia
  - Chestnut wattle-eye, Dyaphorophyia castanea
  - West African wattle-eye, Dyaphorophyia hormophora
  - White-spotted wattle-eye, Dyaphorophyia tonsa
- Genus Platysteira
  - Brown-throated wattle-eye, Platysteira cyanea
  - White-fronted wattle-eye, Platysteira albifrons
  - Black-throated wattle-eye, Platysteira peltata
  - Banded wattle-eye, Platysteira laticincta
  - Red-cheeked wattle-eye, Platysteira blissetti
  - Black-necked wattle-eye, Platysteira chalybea
  - Jameson's wattle-eye, Platysteira jamesoni
  - Yellow-bellied wattle-eye, Platysteira concreta
- Genus Batis
  - Margaret's batis, Batis margaritae
  - Short-tailed batis, Batis mixta
  - Dark batis, Batis crypta
  - Rwenzori batis, Batis diops
  - Cape batis, Batis capensis
  - Malawi batis, Batis dimorpha
  - Woodwards' batis, Batis fratrum
  - Chinspot batis, Batis molitor
  - Pale batis, Batis soror
  - Pririt batis, Batis pririt
  - Senegal batis, Batis senegalensis
  - Grey-headed batis, Batis orientalis
  - Western black-headed batis, Batis erlangeri
  - Eastern black-headed batis, Batis minor
  - Pygmy batis, Batis perkeo
  - Gabon batis, Batis minima
  - Ituri batis, Batis ituriensis
  - Fernando Po batis, Batis poensis
  - West African batis, Batis occulta
  - Angola batis, Batis minulla
