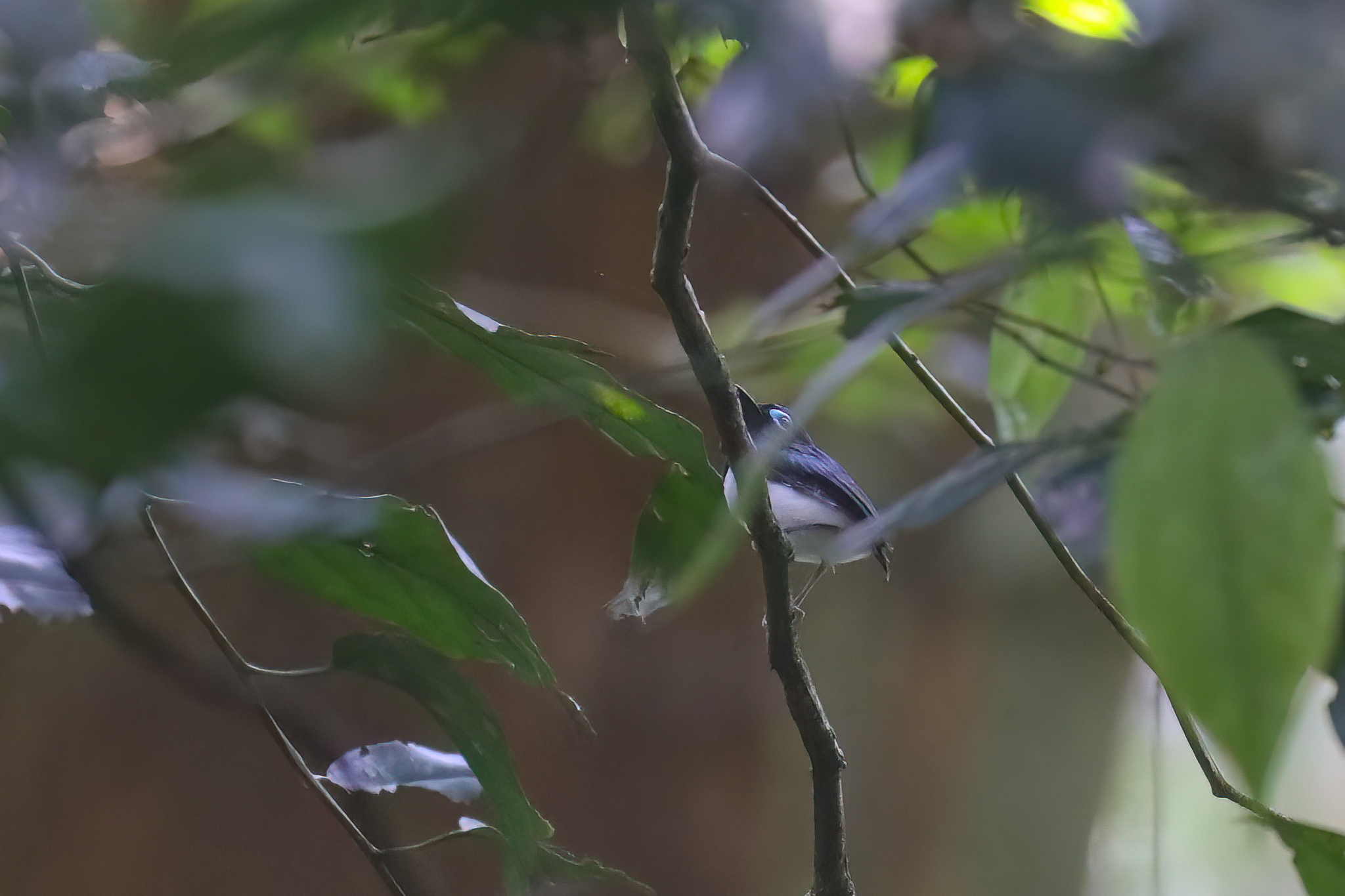

Conservation status
- Least Concern (IUCN 3.1)

Scientific classification
- Kingdom: Animalia
- Phylum: Chordata
- Class: Aves
- Order: Passeriformes
- Family: Platysteiridae
- Genus: Platysteira
- Species: P. jamesoni

Binomial name
- Platysteira jamesoni (Sharpe, 1890)

= Jameson's wattle-eye =

Species of bird

Jameson's wattle-eye (Platysteira jamesoni) is a species of bird in the family Platysteiridae. It is found in Democratic Republic of the Congo, Kenya, South Sudan, Tanzania, and Uganda. Its natural habitats are subtropical or tropical moist lowland forests and subtropical or tropical moist montane forests. It is named after James Sligo Jameson.
