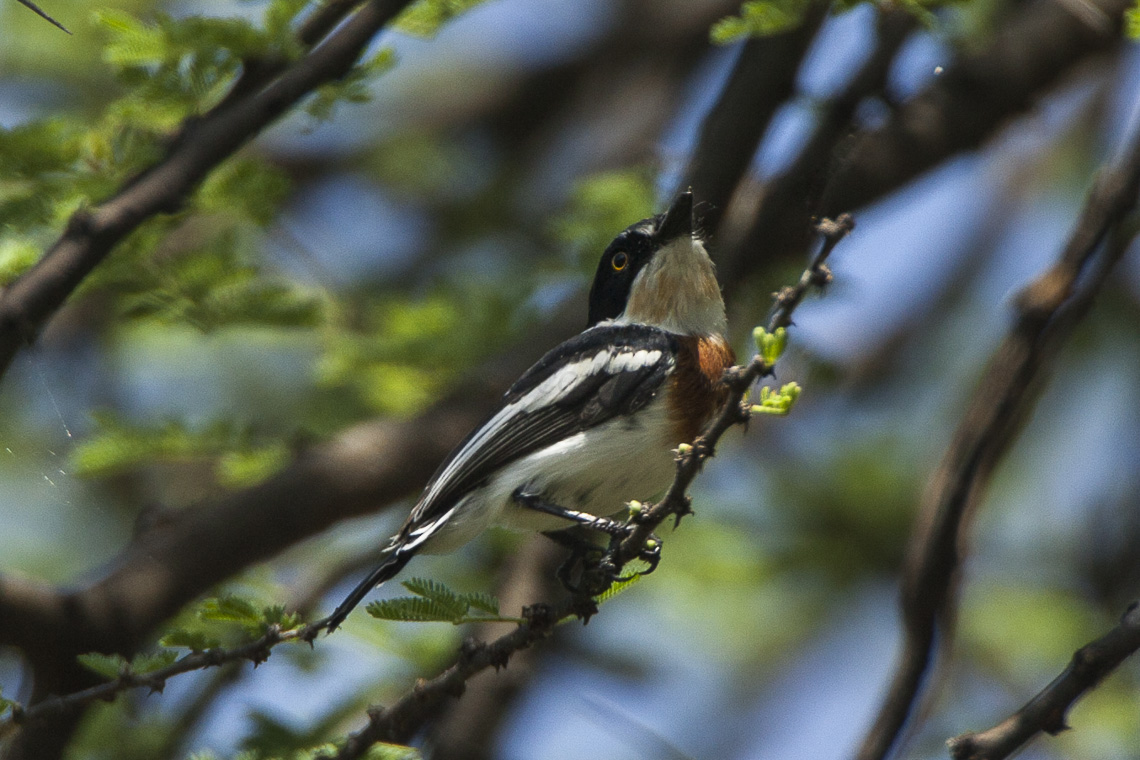

Conservation status
- Least Concern (IUCN 3.1)

Scientific classification
- Kingdom: Animalia
- Phylum: Chordata
- Class: Aves
- Order: Passeriformes
- Family: Platysteiridae
- Genus: Batis
- Species: B. perkeo

Binomial name
- Batis perkeo Neumann, 1907

= Pygmy batis =

Species of bird

The pygmy batis (Batis perkeo) is a very small insectivorous bird which finds its food foraging among leaves, it is a member of the wattle-eyes family, the Platysteiridae. It occurs in the dry savannahs of north-eastern Africa.

== Description ==
The pygmy batis, as its name suggests, is a tiny, rather dumpy but dapper black, white and grey bird with similarities to the flycatchers. The male has a bluish-grey head and back with a contrasting black face mask and short white supercilium above the yellow eye. The rump and lower back are spotted with white and the rump feathers are relatively long giving a fluffy appearance. It has black wings which have a broad white strip formed by the broad white edges to feathers of the median and greater coverts, and the inner secondaries and tertials. The tail is black but the outer tail feathers have white edges and tips. The underparts are white, broken with a narrow black breast band. The females are similar to the males but have a pale rufous-buff breast band and chin and the face mask, supercilium and wing stripe are buffy brown. The bill and legs are black. The pygmy batis has a body length of 8–9 cm (3.1–3.5 in) and a weight of 5–9 g (0.18–0.32 oz).

=== Voice ===
The main call of the pygmy batis is a ling series of repeated sharp high pitched whistles.

== Distribution and habitat ==
The pygmy batis occurs in southern Ethiopia, extreme south eastern South Sudan, southern Somalia, eastern Uganda, inland Kenya and north eastern Tanzania.

The preferred habitat is scrub made up of Senegalia spp, Commiphora spp and other "thorn" species in arid and semi-arid lowlands with rainfall falling between 250 and 500 mm (9.8 and 19.7 in) per year. Also found in wooded and bushy grassland, but avoids riverine forest.

== Habits ==
The pygmy batis is an active, arboreal bird which lives in pairs or small family groups. Its habits are considered to be likely to be similar to other savannah batises. They feed mainly within the foliage and glean most of their insect prey from leaves and twigs, with a small proportion taken on the wing. It will join other bird species in mixed foraging parties. The breeding biology is almost unknown but egg laying probably occurs in February and March.
