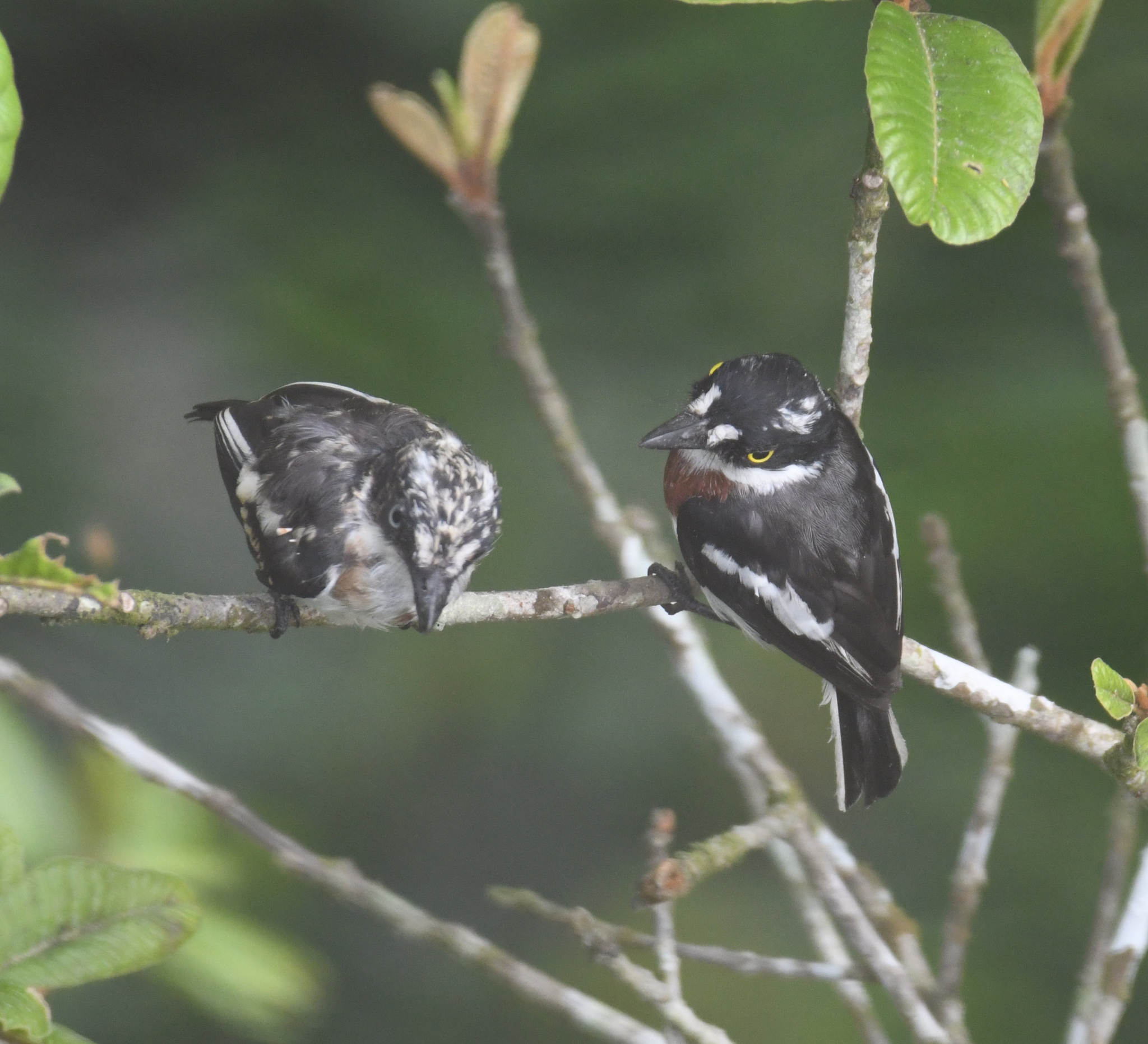

Conservation status
- Least Concern (IUCN 3.1)

Scientific classification
- Kingdom: Animalia
- Phylum: Chordata
- Class: Aves
- Order: Passeriformes
- Family: Platysteiridae
- Genus: Batis
- Species: B. occulta

Binomial name
- Batis occulta Lawson, 1984

Synonyms
- Batis poensis occulta

= West African batis =

Species of bird

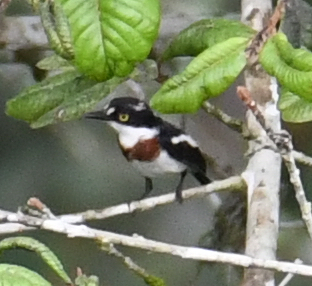
West African batis

The West African batis (Batis occulta) is a species of bird in the family Platysteiridae. It is found in Cameroon, Central African Republic, Republic of the Congo, Ivory Coast, Equatorial Guinea, Gabon, Ghana, Liberia, Nigeria, and Sierra Leone. Its natural habitat is subtropical or tropical moist lowland forests. It is sometimes considered a subspecies of the Fernando Po batis.
