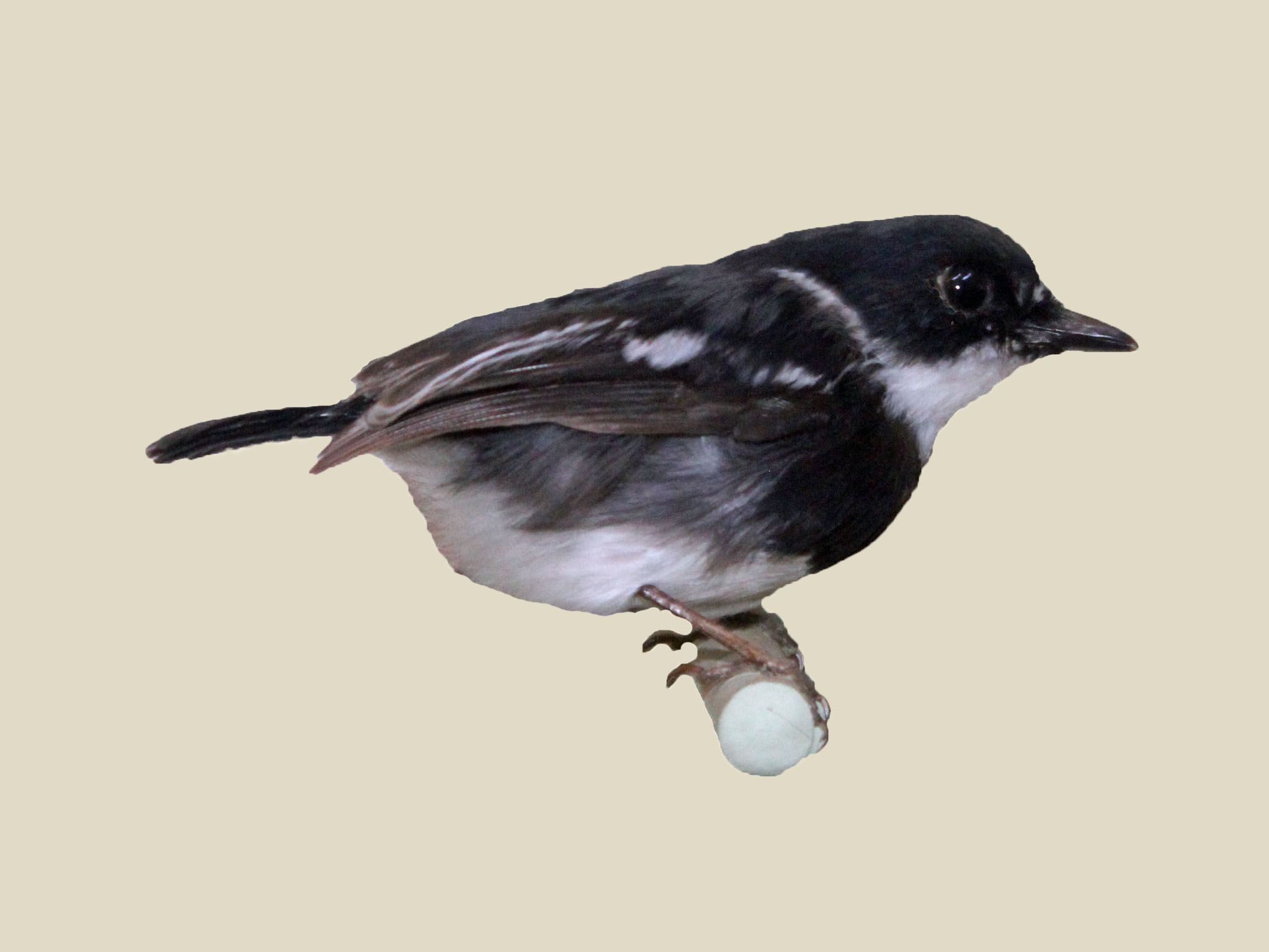
- specimen at Nairobi National Museum
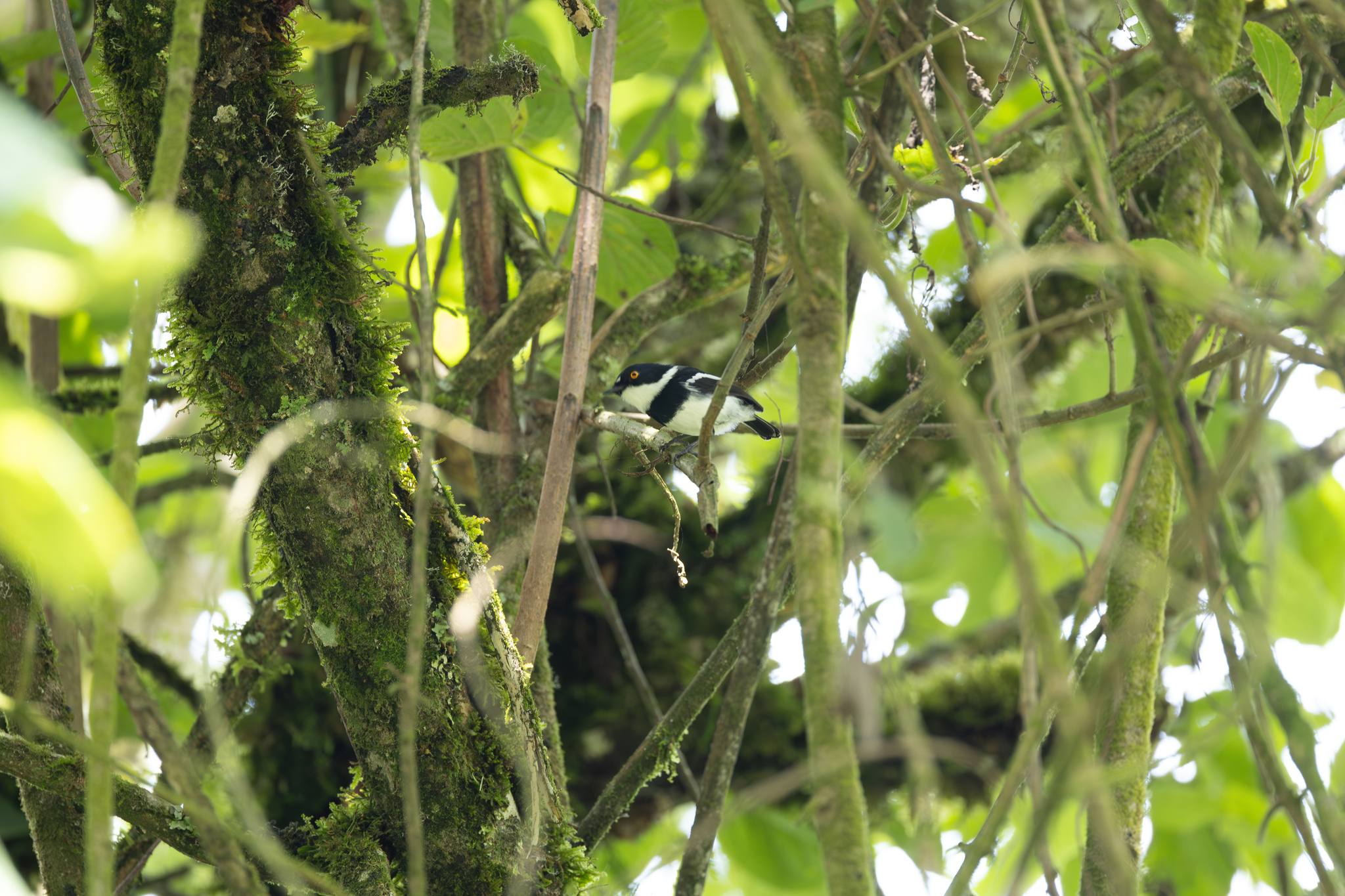

Conservation status
- Least Concern (IUCN 3.1)

Scientific classification
- Kingdom: Animalia
- Phylum: Chordata
- Class: Aves
- Order: Passeriformes
- Family: Platysteiridae
- Genus: Batis
- Species: B. diops

Binomial name
- Batis diops Jackson, 1905

= Rwenzori batis =

Species of bird

The Rwenzori batis (Batis diops) is a bird native to the Albertine Rift montane forests, where it inhabits altitudes of 1,340–3,300 m (4,400–10,830 ft).

== Description ==
The Rwenzori batis is a small, active black and white Old World flycatcher. The upperparts are dark bluish black with a white stripe along the wing and a white loral spot. The underparts are mostly white except for a glossy bluish black breast band, a black chin spot and black thighs and grey axillaries. The tail is black with the feathers having white tips and white edges on the outer tail feathers. The sexes are similar except that males have yellow eyes and females have been reported sometimes to have orangey-red eyes. Juveniles are similar to adults but the plumage has a more rufous cast. The Rwenzori batis measures 11–12 cm (4.3–4.7 in) in length, and it weighs 8–15.5 g (0.28–0.55 oz).

=== Voice ===
The territorial call is a slow low-pitched whistle, which has been described as both ventriloqual and eerie. It is repeated with an interval of 2–4 seconds between each whistle.

== Distribution and habitat ==
The Rwenzori batis occurs in the Albertine Rift from the Rwenzori Mountains in the north to Mount Kabobo in the south. It was also recorded in western Uganda, Rwanda and Burundi. It inhabits montane evergreen forest at altitudes of 1,340–3,300 m (4,400–10,830 ft), foremost in dense African alpine bamboo forest or otherwise closed canopy forest on ridges. It also occurs in mixed forest and scrub.

In 2004, it was recorded in Virunga National Park, Mgahinga Gorilla National Park and Volcanoes National Park.

== Behaviour and ecology ==
The breeding biology and habits of the Rwenzori batis are little known. It is a shy, active bird which is constantly moving but tends to keep hidden in the foliage. It normally forages in mid levels in undergrowth at 2–6 m (6.6–19.7 ft) above the ground but also in lower canopy of tall trees. It is insectivorous, flycatching using short flights but most food is probably gleaned from the foliage and twigs. The male appears to regularly feed the incubating or brooding females; the nest and its contents have never been formally described.

== Taxonomy ==
The Rwenzori batis belongs to the family Platysteiridae, which also contains Margaret's batis, the Cape batis, Forest batis, dark batis and Woodwards's batis. The Rwenzori batis appears to replace the Ituri batis at higher altitudes.
