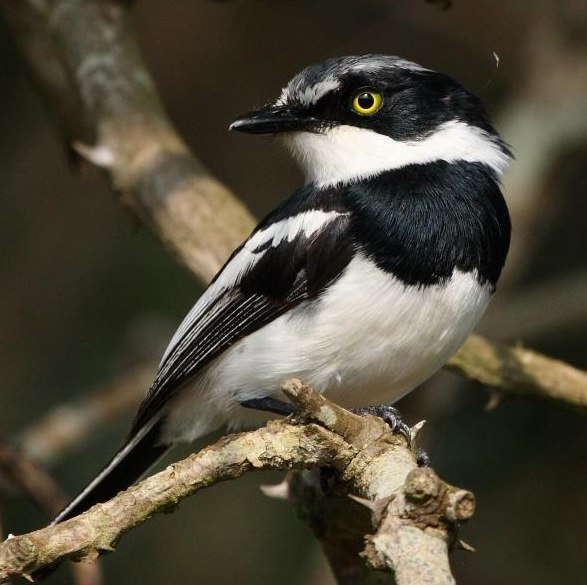
- Male in South Africa
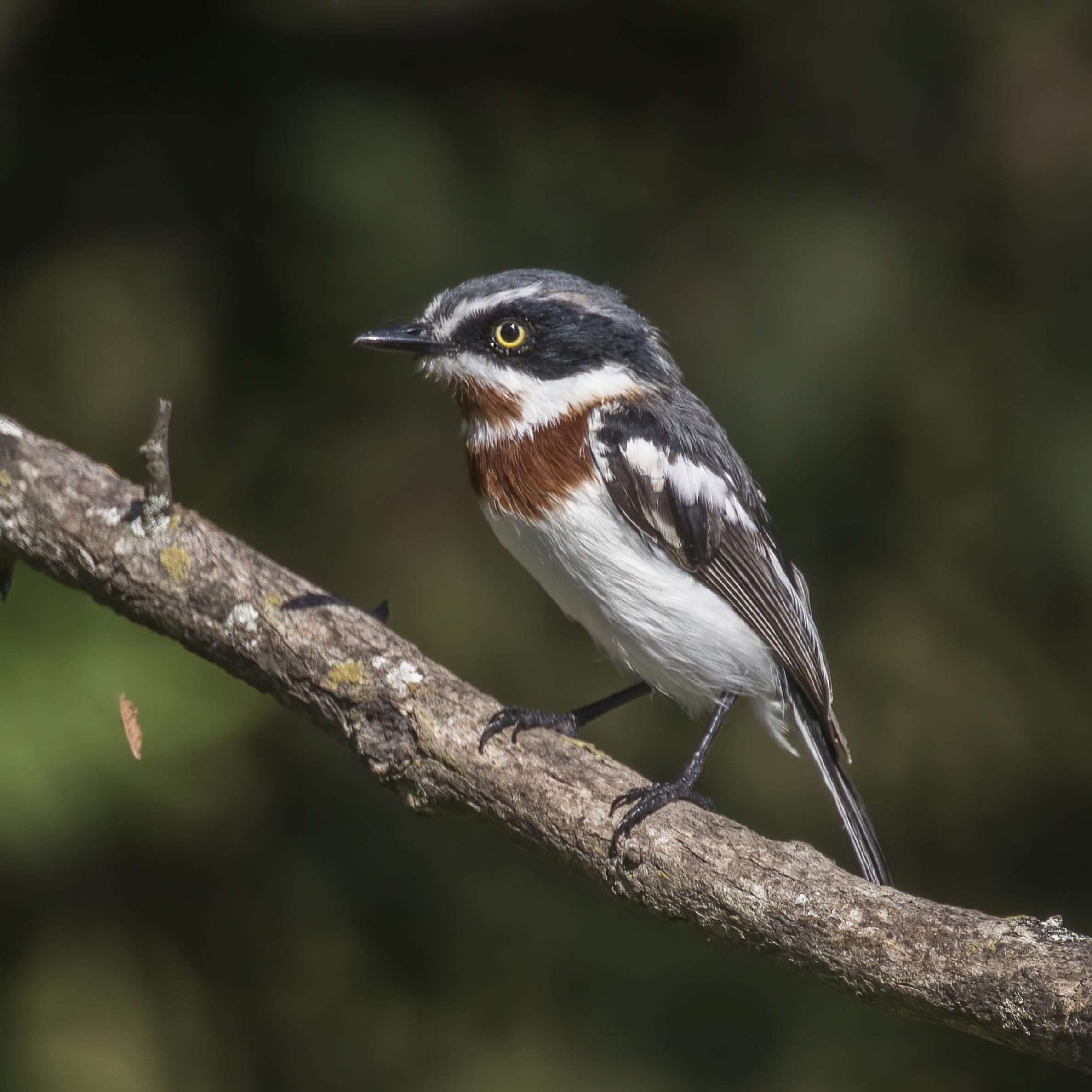
- Female in Zimbabwe

Conservation status
- Least Concern (IUCN 3.1)

Scientific classification
- Kingdom: Animalia
- Phylum: Chordata
- Class: Aves
- Order: Passeriformes
- Family: Platysteiridae
- Genus: Batis
- Species: B. molitor

Binomial name
- Batis molitor (Küster, 1836)

= Chinspot batis =

Species of bird

call

The chinspot batis (Batis molitor) is a small songbird of the genus Batis in the family Platysteiridae which is a common and widespread species in the woodlands of southern Africa from the Eastern Cape north to 3°N in southern Kenya and Gabon. It forms a superspecies with other rather similar members of the genus Batis.

== Description ==
The chinspot batis is a rather stout bird 12–13 cm (4.7–5.1 in) in length. It has a black mask on its face, with a short white eyestripe, a grey cap and a white throat. The upperparts are grey with a prominent white wing stripe. The eyes are yellow while the legs and bill are black. The underparts are white with a black breast band in the males, the female has a chestnut breast band and a chestnut spot on the throat. Young birds are similar to females but the breast band and spot on the throat are tawny.

== Distribution ==
It is found in Angola, Botswana, Burundi, Republic of the Congo, DRC, Eswatini, Gabon, Kenya, Lesotho, Malawi, Mozambique, Namibia, Rwanda, South Africa, South Sudan, Tanzania, Uganda, Zambia, and Zimbabwe.

== Habits ==
The chinspot batis is not normally sociable and is usually encountered singly or in pairs. It is a very active bird, moving its head in a constant search for prey, while it flicks its tail and wings, jerks its body and cocks its head. In the austral winter and early spring often forms "parliaments", which are congregations of up to ten birds, often consisting of birds of one sex. The birds in these parliaments display by flicking their wings to make a noise known as "wing-fripping" and call at each other and very often actually engage in fights between birds. Chinspot batises are territorial throughout the year, defending an area of around 5 hectares (12 acres) which the male advertises with a descending three note whistle from a prominent perch, the female may join the male in a duet. This call is made in a head up posture, exposing the conspicuous white throat. In higher intensity territorial displays the male flies around in short circular flights above the canopy in a jerking, jinky flight with his rump fluffed out, his head held up and making frog like calls, whistling and fripping his wings. They are aggressive towards potential predators, especially owls and Laniarius bush-shrikes.

Prey is most often foraged for in trees, either by hawking or by gleaning from foliage, most food is caught within the canopy. Sometimes hawks in the air like a flycatcher and very rarely catches prey on the ground. The prey is caught with an audible snap of the bill and then held down with one foot and stripped, larger prey items may be beaten against a branch. Arthropods but especially insects and insect larvae make up the largest part of their diet but spiders are included too.

=== Breeding ===
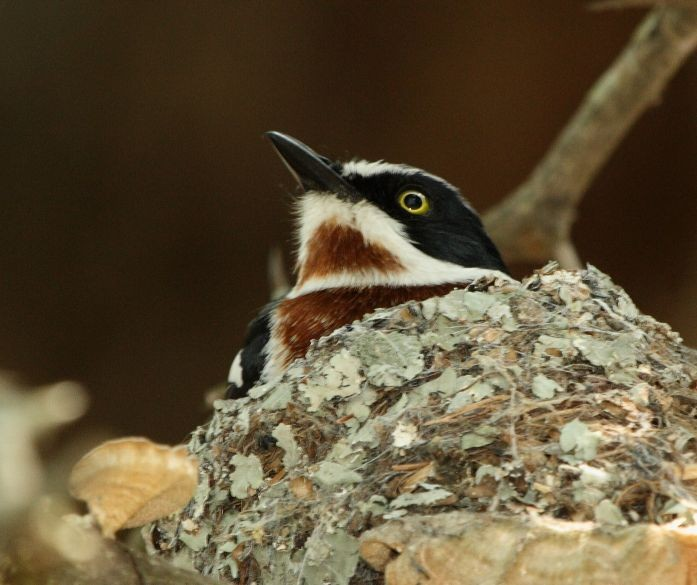
Female incubating

The nest of the chinspot batis nest is a small cup constructed from plant fibres and spider webs and decorated with lichen. It is built by both sexes on a horizontal branch. The female lays one to four eggs which she incubates for 16–18 days, both adults feed the young.

In a study of the breeding biology of chinspot batis conducted in Eswatini it was found that the nests were mainly constructed in bushes or trees protected by thorns. The eggs were laid between late September and early January, in the austral spring, with a notable peak in laying in November. The chinspot batis studied had a fledging rate of 0.65 fledglings per pair per annum. Pairs were normally single brooded unless breeding failed or fledged chicks disappeared. A replacement nest is normally built where a previous nest had failed. The adults were observed to prey mainly on caterpillars and moths and this was confirmed by observations at the nest as the young were fed predominantly with moths and caterpillars. The study also found that the rate at which nestlings were fed was dependent on their age, the older chicks receiving food more often than younger ones. In contrast to nestlings, younger fledglings were fed at a higher rate than older ones.

== Habitat ==
The chinspot batis is found in Savanna woodland, mainly deciduous, including miombo, i.e. Brachystegia woodland, riverine thickets, bushveld and scrub. It can also be found in cultivated habitats such as orchards, farmland, gardens and parks. In the central African mountains it reaches 3,000 m (9,800 ft). Its habitat specificity is greater in the northern parts of its range where there is more competition from other batises.

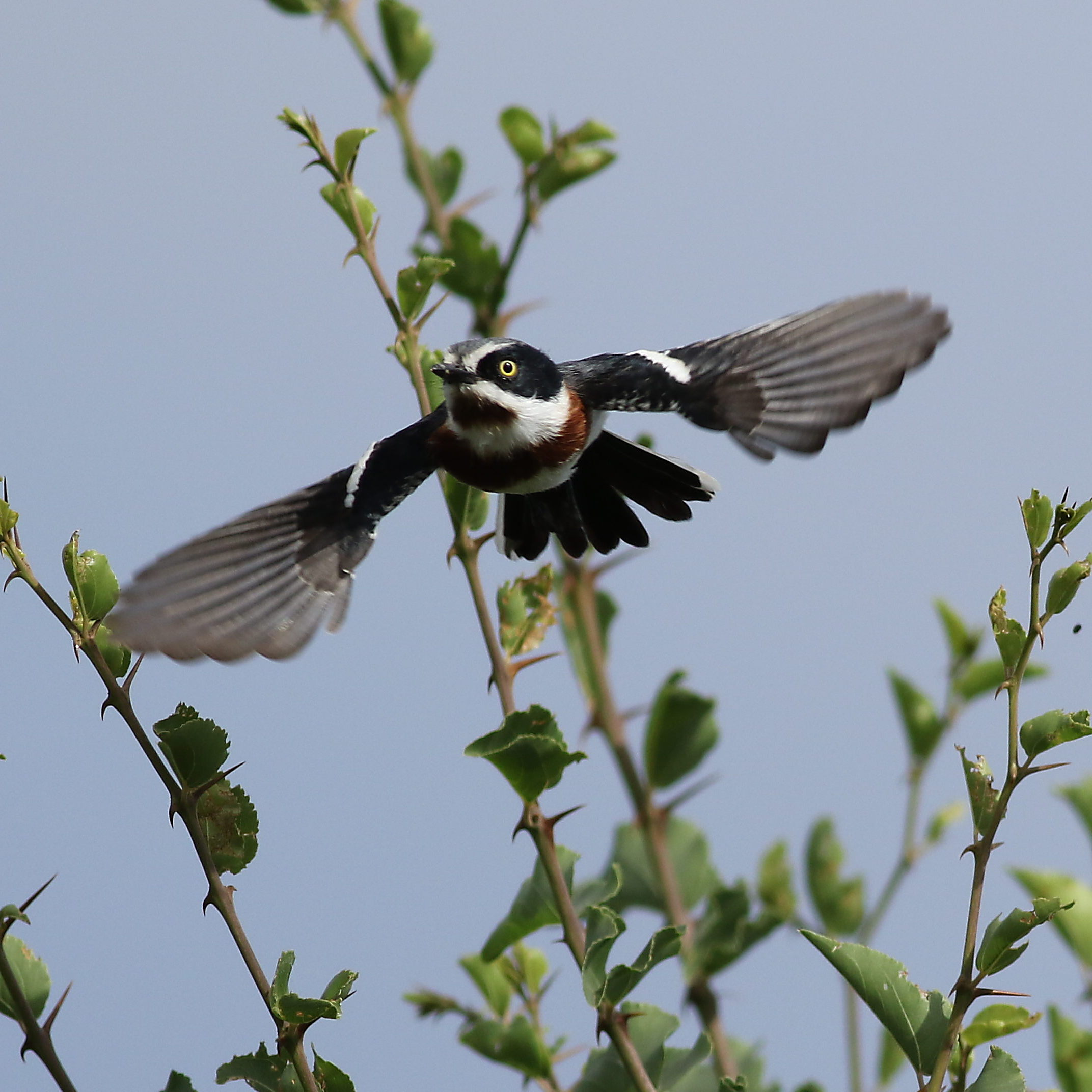
female in flight

The chinspot batis forms a superspecies with other species of woodland and forest batises, in southern Africa the representatives of this superspecies are the pririt batis, Woodwards's batis, pale batis and Cape batis. Woodwards and Cape batises replace the chinspot batis in forest while the pririt batis and pale batis replace it geographically in arid woodlands to the west (pririt) and humid coastal woodlands to the east (pale).

There are currently four recognised subspecies of chinspot batis.

- B. m. pintoi Lawson, 1966

Range: South-eastern Gabon to Angola, south-western Zaire and north-western Zambia

- B. m. puella Reichenow, 1893

Range: Eastern Zaire to Uganda, western Kenya and western Tanzania

- B. m. palliditergum Clancey, 1955

Range: Southern Zaire to Namibia, Botswana, Malawi and north-western South Africa

- B. m. molitor (Küster, 1836)

Range: Southern Mozambique to eastern South Africa
