= Black-headed batis =

Black-headed batis may refer to:

- Eastern black-headed batis (Batis minor), found in eastern Africa
- Western black-headed batis (Batis erlangeri), found in central Africa
