= Fratrum =

Fratrum nay refer to:

- Batis fratrum, a species of bird in the family Platysteiridae.
- Toller Fratrum, a very small village in West Dorset, England.
- Unitas Fratrum, the original name for the organisation that became the Moravian Church.
