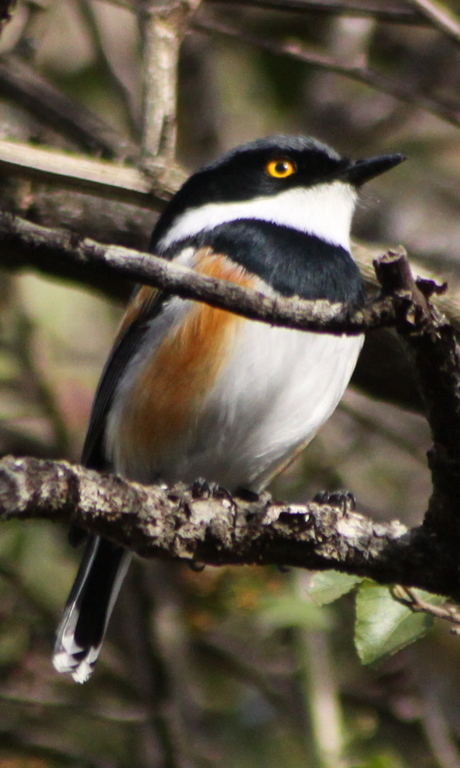
- Cape batis, Batis capensis

Scientific classification
- Kingdom: Animalia
- Phylum: Chordata
- Class: Aves
- Order: Passeriformes
- Family: Platysteiridae
- Genus: Batis; F. Boie, 1833

Type species
- Muscicapa capensis Linnaeus, 1766

Species
- See text

= Batis (bird) =

Genus of birds

Batis (pronounced BAT-iss) is a genus of passerine birds in the wattle-eye family. Its species are resident in Africa south of the Sahara. They were previously classed as a subfamily of the Old World flycatcher family, Muscicapidae.

They are small stout insect-eating birds, usually found in open forests or bush. The nest is a small neat cup low in a tree or bush. They hunt by flycatching, or by taking prey from the ground like a shrike.

Batis species are strikingly patterned, typically with a grey crown, black eye mask, dark back, and paler underparts, often with a coloured or black breast band and white on the throat which contrasts strongly with the black eye stripe. Male and female plumages usually differ.

The song is typically a descending triple whistle.

== Taxonomy ==
The genus Batis was introduced by the German zoologist Friedrich Boie in 1833. The type species was subsequently designated as the Cape batis. The name of the genus is from the Ancient Greek batis, batidos, an unidentified worm-eating bird mentioned by Aristotle.

The genus contains 20 species.

Image	Scientific name	Common name	Distribution
	Batis diops	Rwenzori batis	Albertine Rift montane forests
	Batis margaritae	Margaret's batis	mount Moco (Angola), southern DR Congo and northern Zambia
	Batis mixta	Forest batis	eastern Tanzania and southeastern Kenya
	Batis crypta	Dark batis	Eastern Arc Mountains of Tanzania and northern Malawi
	Batis dimorpha	Malawi batis	Malawi and adjacent areas
	Batis capensis	Cape batis	southern Afromontane
	Batis fratrum	Woodwards' batis	Mozambique
	Batis molitor	Chinspot batis	centre/southern sub-Saharan Africa
	Batis senegalensis	Senegal batis	West Africa
	Batis orientalis	Grey-headed batis	northeastern sub-Saharan Africa
	Batis soror	Pale batis	sout-eastern Kenya to southern Mozambique
	Batis pririt	Pririt batis	southern Africa
	Batis minor	Eastern black-headed batis	central-northern sub-Saharan Africa
	Batis erlangeri	Western black-headed batis	east Africa
	Batis perkeo	Pygmy batis	mainly Horn of Africa
	Batis minulla	Angola batis	western Central Africa
	Batis minima	Gabon batis	western Congolian rainforests
	Batis ituriensis	Ituri batis	northeastern Congo Basin
	Batis occulta	West African batis	Guineo-congolean region
	Batis poensis	Fernando Po batis	Bioko
