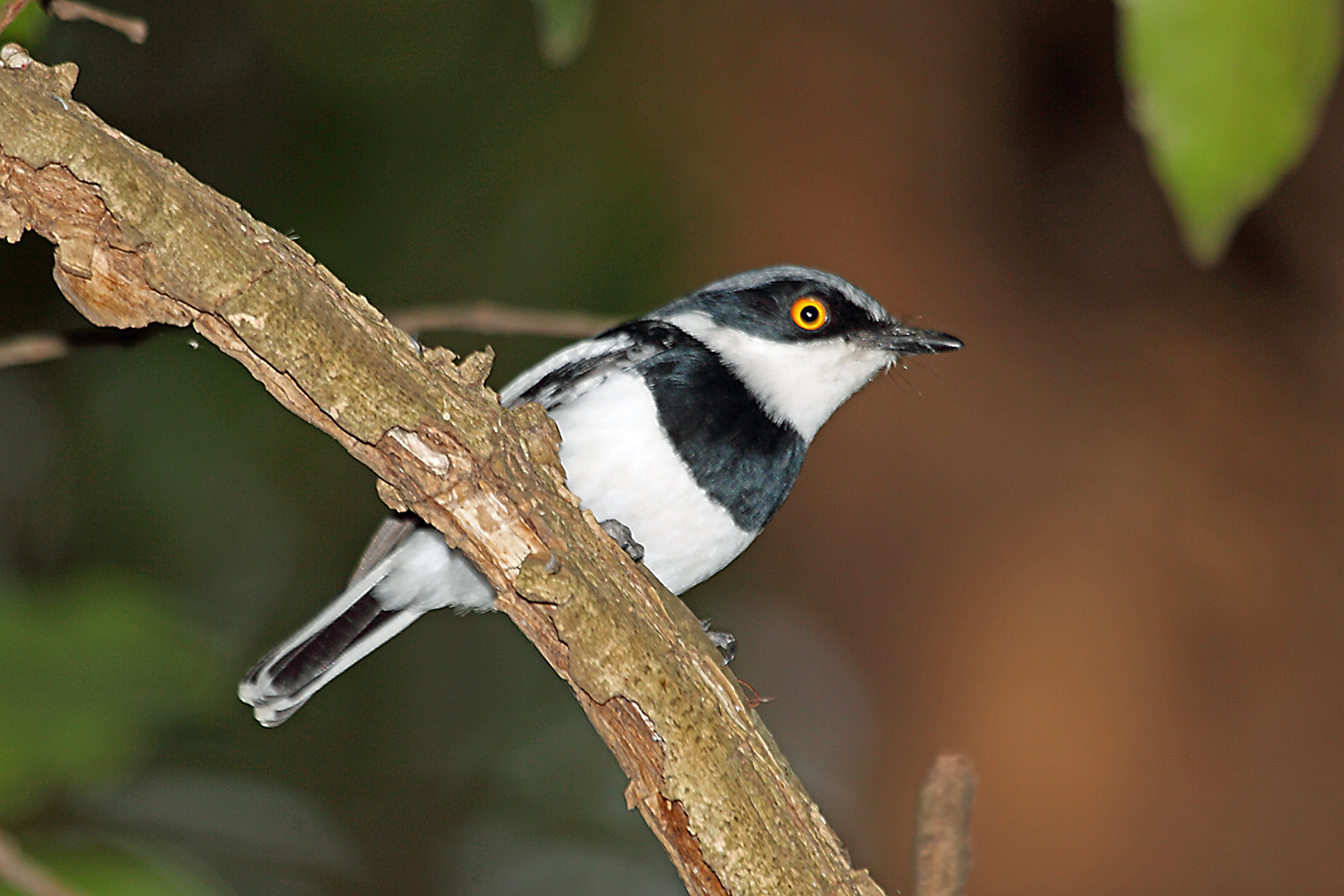

Conservation status
- Least Concern (IUCN 3.1)

Scientific classification
- Kingdom: Animalia
- Phylum: Chordata
- Class: Aves
- Order: Passeriformes
- Family: Platysteiridae
- Genus: Batis
- Species: B. margaritae

Binomial name
- Batis margaritae Boulton, 1934

= Margaret's batis =

Species of bird

Margaret's batis (Batis margaritae) or Boulton's batis, is a species of small passerine bird in the wattle-eyes family, Platysteiridae. It is found in south western central Africa.

== Taxonomy ==
Margaret's batis was described by the American zoologist Wolfrid Rudyerd Boulton in 1934. The binomial and common names honour the American historian and novelist Margaret Leech (1893-1974).

Two subspecies are recognised:

- B. m. margaritae Boulton, 1934 – Mount Moco in western Angola.
- B. m. kathleenae White, C.M.N. 1941 – southern Democratic Republic of Congo in southern Katanga and north western Zambia; possibly also in the extreme east of Angola, in eastern Moxico.

== Description ==
Margaret's batis is a small, mainly black and white shrike-like bird with a black face mask and reddish eye, in a mainly dark grey head. They have white underparts with a broad black breast band in both sexes, with black wings which are marked in the male with a white wing stripe while the female has a rufous wing stripe. The tail is black with white outer tail feathers. Juveniles resemble the females but are duller and have brown eye. The bill and legs are black. They measure 11–12 cm (4.3–4.7 in) in length and weigh 11.5–15.5 g (0.41–0.55 oz).

=== Voice ===
Margaret's batis is known to make various whistles and churring calls. The territorial call is a repeated, soft, thin "hoo-hoo-hoo-hooit-hooit-hooit" which varies in length. The female and male duet with a tweeting call.

== Distribution and habitat ==
Margaret's batis occurs mostly in forests dominated by Cryptosepalum spp but also occurs in other types of dry evergreen forest, riverine forest and secondary scrub growth. It is usually found in pairs and it is thought that its social behaviour is similar to that of other batises. It forages in trees and is not as restless as many of its congeners when foraging, often staying still for up to a minute. It joins mixed foraging flocks, often in the company of chinspot batises. In Zambia there appear to be local movements out of Cryptosepalum forest during the November to April rainy season.

== Behaviour ==
The breeding biology of Margaret's batis is little known. A nest was observed on Mount Moco, Angola, in 2010 when a single nest containing two eggs was found in the fork of a 1 m (3 ft 3 in) tall sapling in an area of dense undergrowth at an altitude of 2,390 m (7,840 ft) was attended by a pair of Margaret's batis. The nest was placed at a height of around 90 cm (35 in) from the ground, The inside of the nest cup was lined with very thin strips of grass, while the outside consisted of fine grass and mosses bound with spider's web, with small pieces of lichen attached to the spiders webs. The construction and dimensions of the nest are very similar to those of other batises.
