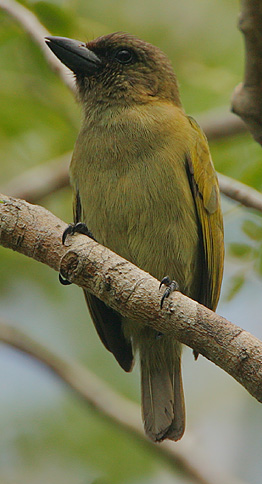
- The nominate race in Kenya

Conservation status
- Least Concern (IUCN 3.1)

Scientific classification
- Kingdom: Animalia
- Phylum: Chordata
- Class: Aves
- Order: Piciformes
- Family: Lybiidae
- Genus: Cryptolybia; Clancey, 1979
- Species: C. olivacea

Binomial name
- Cryptolybia olivacea (Shelley, 1880)
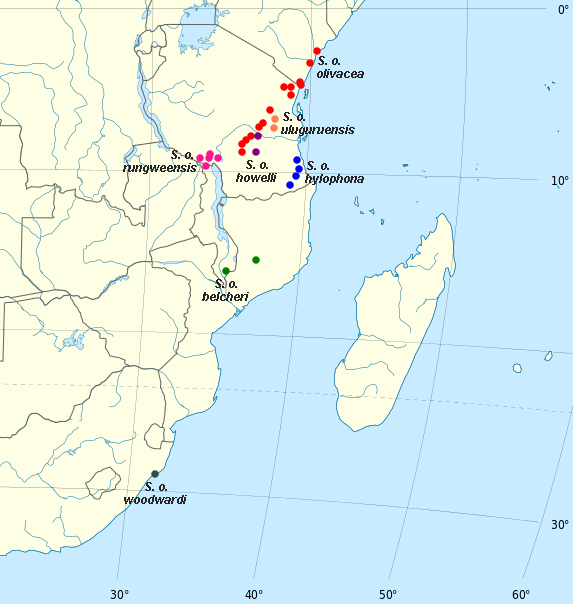
- ● C. o. olivacea ● S. o. uluguruensis ● C. o. rungweensis ● S. o. howelli ● C. o. hylophona ● S. o. belcheri ● C. o. woodwardi

Synonyms
- Barbatula olivacea Shelley, 1880; Stactolaema olivacea (Shelley, 1880); Pogoniulus olivaceus (Shelley, 1880)

= Green barbet =

Species of bird

The green barbet (Cryptolybia olivacea) is a species of bird in the Lybiidae family (African barbets). It is found in Kenya, Tanzania, Malawi, Mozambique and South Africa. It occurs in forests from sea level to 1,800 metres (5,900 ft). Its isolated populations are vulnerable to forest clearing.

== Description ==
They have dull ginger-olive plumage, but are yellower on the wings, and paler below. The head and chin are dark brown in the nominate race, and the eyes vary from dull red to orange. The bill is black and the feet blackish. Juveniles are duller, with brown eyes.

== Call ==
Their call is a repetitive chock, chock, ..., or chop, chop, ..., sometimes in a duet.

== Habits ==
They frequent fruiting branches in the subcanopy, and vary from solitary to social during foraging and roosting. It is a sedentary species which is not known to undertake any movements. It may be particularly dependent on the fruit of wild figs. It breeds in cavities in tree trunks during midsummer.

== Taxonomy ==
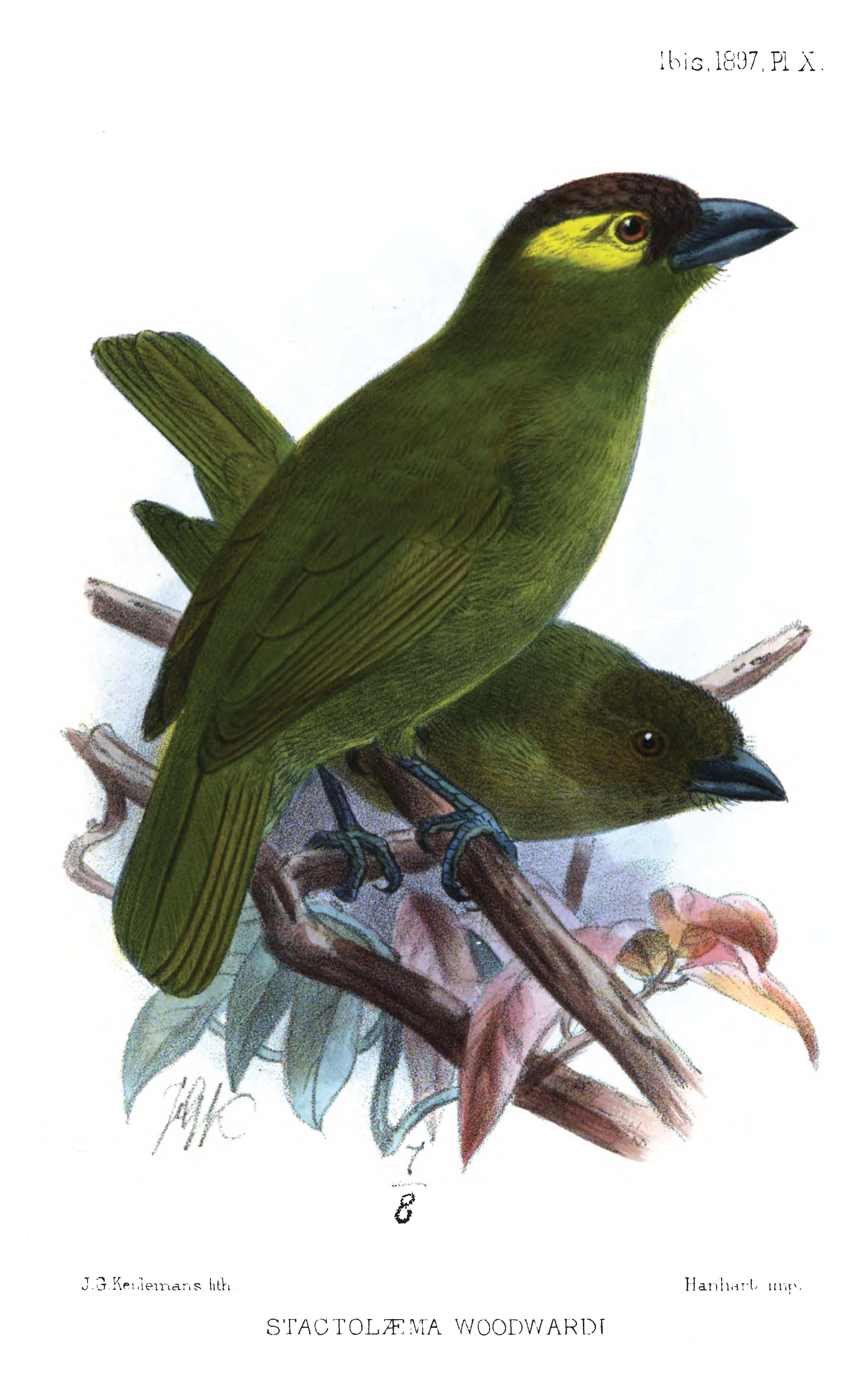
1897 illustration of a pair of Woodward's barbets, by J.G. Keulemans.

The number of races (or species) is not generally agreed upon, and the conservation status of the taxa depends critically on their taxonomic evaluation. Race C. o. hylophona is sometimes merged with woodwardi in a taxon with tentative species status, the so-called Woodward's barbet. These birds have the ear coverts and hind brow marked in yellow, as opposed to the dusky-headed populations. The type was obtained from oNgoye Forest in South Africa, and named for its discoverers, the Woodward brothers. C. o. belcheri, which lacks the yellow ear coverts, is endemic to two isolated inselbergs, and may constitute a third species.

== Races ==
International Ornithologists' Union recognizes five subspecies:

- Cryptolybia olivacea olivacea – coastal Kenya to uplands of central Tanzania
- Cryptolybia olivacea howelli – East Udzungwa Mountains in Tanzania
- Cryptolybia olivacea rungweensis – Mt Rungwe and Poroto Mts, Tanzania to Misuku Hills, northern Malawi
- Cryptolybia olivacea belcheri – Mt Thyolo in Malawi and Mt Namuli in Mozambique
- Cryptolybia olivacea woodwardi – oNgoye in KwaZulu-Natal, South Africa

Two subspecies are recognized by other authors:

- Cryptolybia olivacea hylophona – the Ngarama, Rondo (where common) and possibly Mitundumbea forest reserves of coastal Tanzania
- Cryptolybia olivacea uluguruensis – Uluguru Mountains of eastern Tanzania
