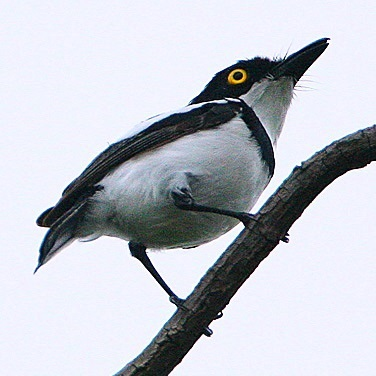
- Male at Faraba, the Gambia

Conservation status
- Least Concern (IUCN 3.1)

Scientific classification
- Kingdom: Animalia
- Phylum: Chordata
- Class: Aves
- Order: Passeriformes
- Family: Platysteiridae
- Genus: Batis
- Species: B. senegalensis

Binomial name
- Batis senegalensis (Linnaeus, 1766)

Synonyms
- Muscicapa senegalensis Linnaeus, 1766

= Senegal batis =

Species of bird

The Senegal batis (Batis senegalensis) is a species of small passerine bird in the wattle-eyes family, Platysteiridae. It occurs in western Africa where it is found in dry savanna and subtropical or tropical dry shrubland. It was originally given the binomial name Muscicapa senegalensis by Carl Linnaeus in 1766.

== Taxonomy ==
In 1760 the French zoologist Mathurin Jacques Brisson included a description of the Senegal batis in his Ornithologie based on a specimen collected in Senegal. He used the French name Le gobe-mouche à poitrine rousse du Sénégal and the Latin Muscicapa Senegalensis pectore rufo. Although Brisson coined Latin names, these do not conform to the binomial system and are not recognised by the International Commission on Zoological Nomenclature. When in 1766 the Swedish naturalist Carl Linnaeus updated his Systema Naturae for the twelfth edition, he added 240 species that had been previously described by Brisson. One of these was the Senegal batis. Linnaeus included a brief description, coined the binomial name Muscicapa senegalensis and cited Brisson's work. The species is now placed in the genus Batis that was introduced by the German zoologist Friedrich Boie in 1833. The species is monotypic.

== Description ==
The Senegal batis is a restless flycatcher-like small bird with the distinctive black, white and grey colours and plumage patterns which are typical of the batises. The adult male has a dark slate grey forehead and crown with a long, broad white supercilium which almost reaches the white nape patch. The face mask is glossy bluish-black. The mantle and upper back are slate grey tinged with brown, the lower back and rump are mottled grey, white and black. The feathers on the rump are long and this gives the rump a fluffy appearance, contrasting with the glossy blue-back uppertail coverts. The wings are brownish black with a white stripe along their length. The underwing coverts are black and the tail is black with white tipped and edged outer tail feathers. The underparts are white, except for the underwing coverts and thighs and the broad glossy blue-black breast band. Adult females are overall paler than males with dusky grey brown forehead and crown, a buff supercilium and nape patch and a black face mask, browner wings and a russet breast band, as well as rufous ting to the chin and upper throat. Juveniles are like duller females. The Senegal batis measures 10 cm (3.9 in) in length and weighs 8–11.4 g (0.28–0.40 oz).

=== Voice ===
The main call of the Senegal batis is a series of medium pitched double and triple note whistles which do not vary in pitch and are frequently introduced with buzzy notes.

== Distribution and habitat ==
The Senegal batis is found from southern Mauritania, Senegal and Gambia east to Nigeria and north and central Cameroon, east to the Benoué Plain and Mandara Mountains.

The Senegal batis inhabits low dry thorny scrub, sparsely treed grasslands and woody savannahs, including open acacia and baobab woodlands.

== Behaviour ==
The Senegal batis maintains a territory throughout the year which the male patrols daily, sitting on high open perches and singing. The territory is shared with the female and with any immatures from the previous years, and they are sometimes seen in family groups. If intruders are seen then the male undertakes and aggressive display which involves an upright stance with the bill held vertically, the breast and crown feather fluffed out, swinging his rear end while jerking his tail. In flight the aggressive display is a bouncing flight with the bill held up and the crown and rump fluffed out. It will also aggressively mob shrikes, especially the Brubru with bill snapping and wing fripping but uses different behaviour when mobbing hornbills, cuckoos and pearl-spotted owlets or snakes. When mobbing the owlet it crouches, raises its head and shoulders and flicks its tail, the snakes are mobbed by hovering, rattling calls and bill snapping.

It is an arboreal forager and its insect prey is mostly gleaned from foliage, in the outer parts of branches, sometimes on trunks or stems but almost never on the ground. It will flycatch or hawk insects in the air, making sallies of up to 2 m (6.6 ft) to catch prey from a perch, has also been known to impale larger prey on thorns. The fork-tailed drongo has been recorded as kelptoparasitising prey from the Senegal batis.

The breeding season seems to run between January and July. The courtship display is very similar to the territorial aggression display, and the male probably also feeds the female during courtship. The nest is built by both sexes and is a typical batis nest, made of dried grass and strips of bark, decorated with leaves, lichen and bark bound together with spider webs. It is a small neat cup, bound to the fork or thick stem of a bush or tree with spider webs. The nest is often in quite an exposed situation but the decoration seems to act as effective camouflage. Only the female incubates the clutch, which is normally two eggs, for 15 days. The male guards the nest and feeds her, attacking all other birds near the nest, as well as Gambian sun squirrels, but not the striped ground squirrel. The male continues to provide all the food for the females and the young for the first week after hatching, passing food items to the female for her to feed the chicks; after the first week, both sexes forage and feed the chicks. After fledging the young stay in the parents' territory until the start of the next breeding season.
