= Angola batis =

Conservation status
- Least Concern (IUCN 3.1)

Scientific classification
- Kingdom: Animalia
- Phylum: Chordata
- Class: Aves
- Order: Passeriformes
- Family: Platysteiridae
- Genus: Batis
- Species: B. minulla

Binomial name
- Batis minulla (Barboza du Bocage, 1874)

Species of bird

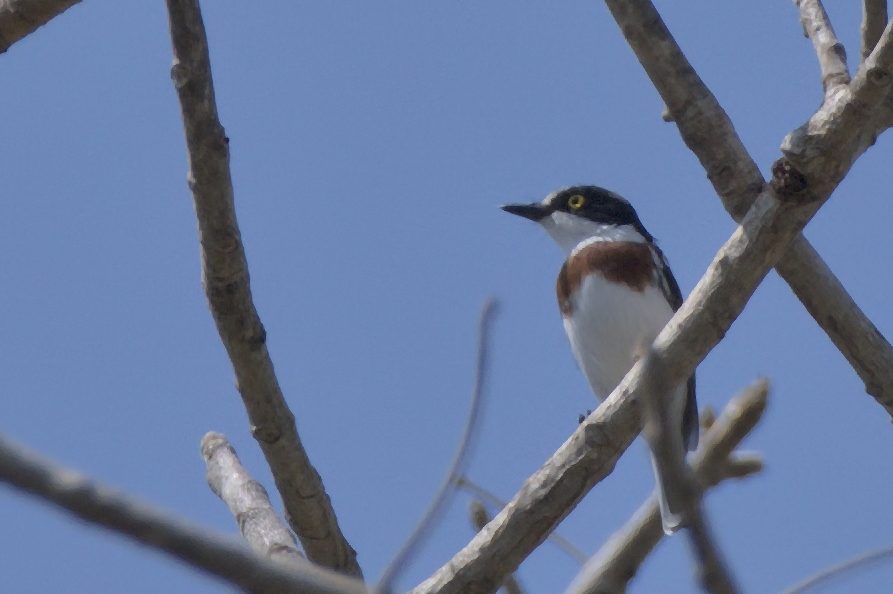
Angolan Batis female

The Angola batis (Batis minulla) is a species of bird in the family Platysteiridae. It is found in western central Africa.

== Description ==
The Angola batis is a small pied songbird with a rather dumpy appearance and a restless nature. The adult males have a bluish grey forehead and crown with a small white spot on the lores and a glossy black mask across the eyes, extending on to the nape and down the sides of the neck with a white spot on the nape. It has a grey mantle, blackish scapulars with the back, rump and uppertail covers being blackish grey with white spots. The wings have black flight feathers with narrow white edges. There is a white wing stripe. The trail is black with white outer tail feathers. The underparts are white except for a black band across the breast and the greyish undertail coverts. The eyes are bright yellow while the bill and legs are black. The female is similar to the male but her breast band is chestnut rather than black. They are about 10 cm (3.9 in) long and weigh 10.4 g (0.37 oz).

=== Voice ===
The calls of the Angola batis are little known, the territorial call is a series of high-pitched notes, "zee-zee-zee-zee-zee", which has been likened to a squeaky bicycle pump.

== Distribution ==
The presence of the Angola batis in south eastern Gabon is yet to be confirmed but the species occurs in the southern Congo through western Democratic Republic of Congo into northern Angola south to the Quiçama National Park, 70 km (43 mi) from Luanda.

== Behaviour and habitat ==
The habits of the Angola batis are little known, it feeds on insects which are often caught in the air by sallying from a perch, a behaviour called "flycatching". The appear to be rather solitary, like other batises, being recorded mainly as single or in pairs. The cup shaped nest is built by both sexes from strips of bark and spider webs and is placed in the fork of a small tree at around head height. The only recorded clutches have consisted of two eggs. Breeding behaviour has been observed in the Democratic Republic of Congo in July.

The Angola batis occurs in secondary and riverine gallery forest, thick woodland dominated by Croton spp as well as adjacent bush, tickets and the ecotone between forest and savannah. Occasionally recorded in dry woodland, especially in the southern part of its range, as well as coffee plantations.
