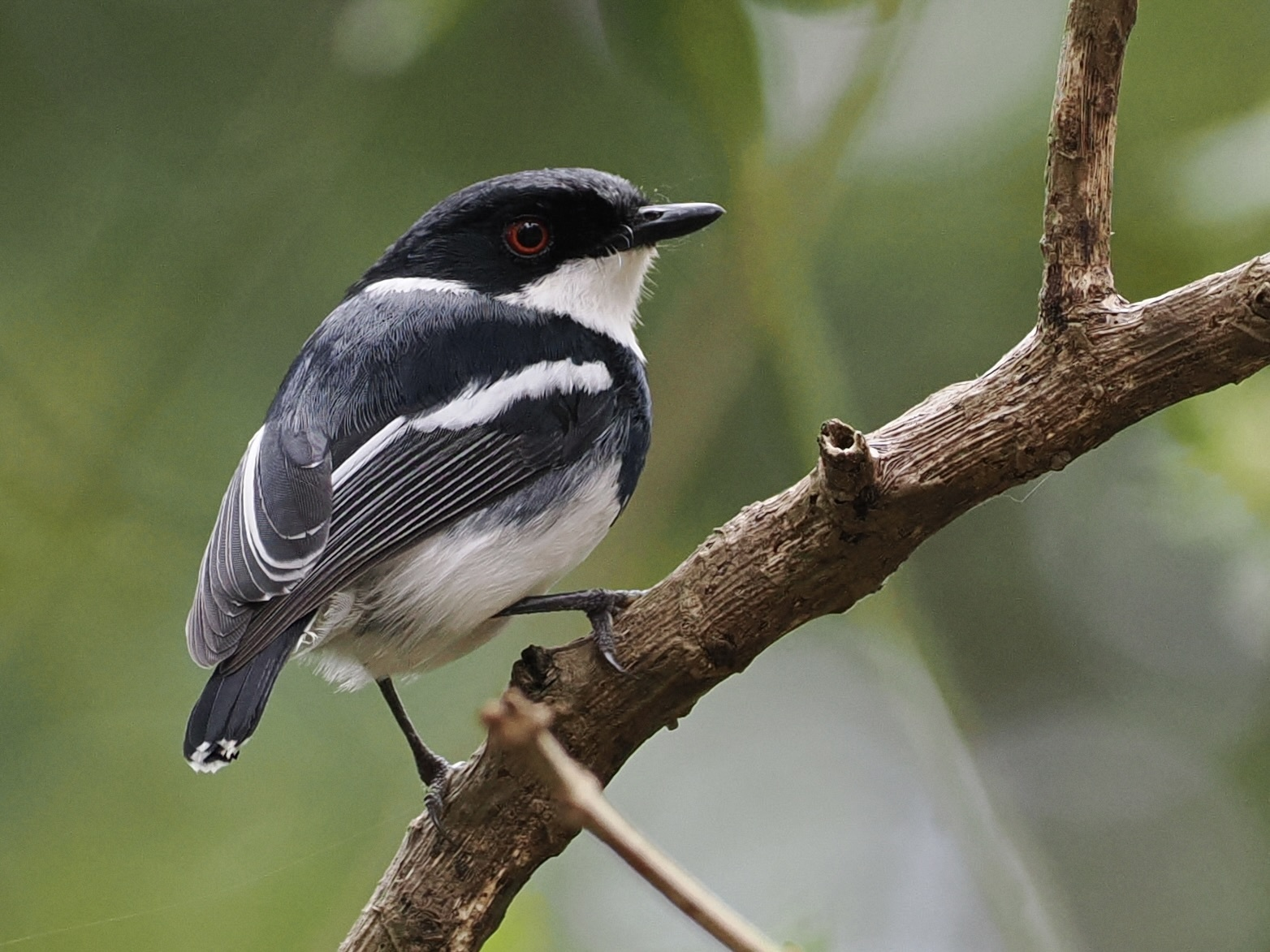

Conservation status
- Least Concern (IUCN 3.1)

Scientific classification
- Kingdom: Animalia
- Phylum: Chordata
- Class: Aves
- Order: Passeriformes
- Family: Platysteiridae
- Genus: Batis
- Species: B. crypta

Binomial name
- Batis crypta Fjeldså, Bowie & Kiure, 2006

= Dark batis =

Species of bird

The dark batis (Batis crypta) is a small passerine bird belonging to the genus Batis in the wattle-eye family, Platysteiridae. It is found in highland forest in south-west Tanzania, northern Malawi, and northern Mozambique. These birds were formerly thought to be forest batises (B. mixta) but in 2006 were described as a new species based on differences in morphology and mitochondrial DNA from those birds in northern Tanzania and Kenya.

== Description ==
The dark batis is about 10 cm (3.9 in) in length and weighs 10–15 g (0.35–0.53 oz). It has a dark bill and legs and red eyes. The male is white below with a broad black breastband. Above it has a dark grey crown, grey back with some black feather-tips, a black face-mask and black wings with a white stripe. The female has a greyish crown, brownish back, dark mask, slight white supercilium and a narrow rufous stripe on the wing. Below it has a rufous chin-spot and breast with whitish tips to some of the feathers.

The forest batis has a slightly shorter tail. Males of the two species are very similar but forest batises have a narrower breastband and usually some hint of a white supercilium which is lacking in the male dark batis. The females are more distinctive: female forest batises have a paler breast and chin with more white tips giving a mottled appearance. There is a conspicuous white supercilium and a broad rufous wing-stripe.

The dark batis has a variety of whistling and harsh churring calls and its wings make a whirring sound in flight. The male's song is a series of short, low whistles.

== Distribution and habitat ==
It is found in the Eastern Arc Mountains of East Africa from the Ukaguru Mountains and Uluguru Mountains of central Tanzania south-westwards as far as the Misuku Hills in northernmost Malawi and the Njesi Highlands in northern Mozambique.

It inhabits evergreen forest from 540 to 2,140 metres (1,770 to 7,020 ft) above sea-level and is most common around 1,500 metres (4,900 ft). It forages mainly in the lower and middle levels of trees, feeding on insects such as termites.
