= Woodward brothers =

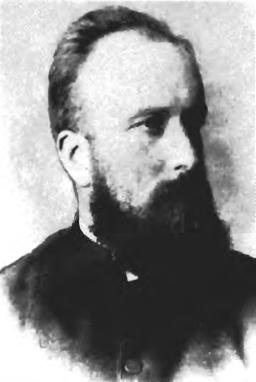
Rev. Richard B. Woodward

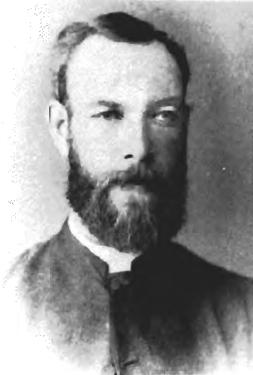
Rev. John D. S. Woodward

The Woodward brothers (as they are known) were Richard Blake Woodward (1848 – c. 1905, Tugela River?) and John Deverell Stewart Woodward (1849 – c.1905), who were English missionaries and ornithologists. They were born in Bathford, England to Richard and Mary Woodward. Through their field expeditions, specimen collecting and publications, they, along with Arthur Stark, established a basis for 20th-century ornithology in the southern African region.

== Missionary activities ==
The brothers were trained as Anglican missionaries. Their first mission was in the Americas, at an unknown location. They published on missionary work in the Americas before they moved to Transvaal in the early 1870s. Here they initially started farming sheep in the Amersfoort district, before moving to Ifafa, Natal, to run a plantation.

They also attended to the nearby St Luke's mission at Harding, where they assisted archdeacon Joseph Barker. They were ordained into the Anglican Church in 1881 at Pietermaritzburg, and by 1883 they were assistant priests at St Luke's. From 1884 they associated with the American Board of Foreign Missions which had stations at Hlatikulu, Zululand, and at the Adam's mission, Amanzimtoti. Their consequent missionary activities and expeditions were undertaken from these missions.

== Field expeditions ==
The brothers had a keen interest in the animal life of the region, which was poorly described in the 1870s. Within a decade of their arrival they started publishing observations concerning crocodiles, baboons and leopards in The Zoologist and The Natal Mercury. Their observations were catalogued and controlled experiments were performed on some animals. From 1880 onwards much of their interest was focussed on the birds of the region. The brothers undertook exploratory expeditions to the Lebombo Mountains and Ngoye Forest in Zululand.

For the first time species like eastern nicator and Livingstone's turaco were found to occur south of the Zambezi. In the forest that still covered the Berea ridge at Port Natal, they collected the type specimen of the garden warbler's eastern race, Sylvia borin woodwardi. It was deemed a new African species, S. woodwardi, when it was named in their honour in 1877. In addition they discovered the isolated southern population of the green barbet at Ngoye forest, which Captain Shelley named for them in 1895, Stactolaema woodwardi. In 1900 their other discovery, Woodwards's batis, was also named for them by Shelley, B. fratrum referring to the brothers.

Many of their bird specimens were sent to R. B. Sharpe at the British Museum, who assisted them with identifications.

== Publications ==
Their ornithological publication, Natal Birds of 1899, introduced 386 bird species of Zululand, the Colony of Natal and the eastern Cape Colony. It constituted the first regional list for southern Africa, and recorded the status of many species. The small book is a sought after collector's item, but mainly for its historical interest. Through the brothers' efforts the early specimen collection of G. Hutchinson was preserved, and interest in regional conservation was increased. They are besides known from many letters, as well as articles written for The Natal Mercury, Ibis and other overseas natural history magazines.

== Unknowns ==
It is not yet known where the brothers were buried, and their publication Wanderings in America has not been traced. By some accounts one of the brothers drowned in the Tugela River.
