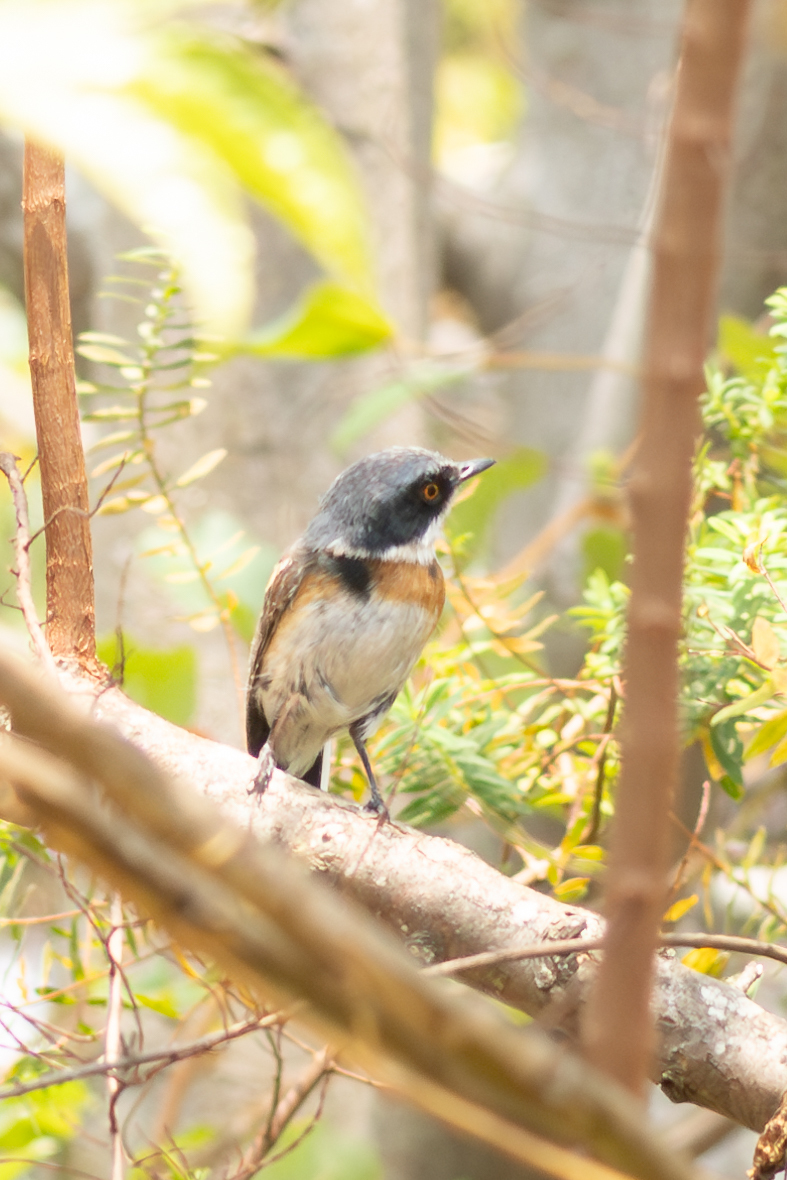

Scientific classification
- Kingdom: Animalia
- Phylum: Chordata
- Class: Aves
- Order: Passeriformes
- Family: Platysteiridae
- Genus: Batis
- Species: B. dimorpha

Binomial name
- Batis dimorpha (Shelley, 1893)

= Malawi batis =

Species of bird

The Malawi batis (Batis dimorpha) is a species of bird in the family Platysteiridae. It is found in Malawi and adjadjacent areas of eastern Zambia, and northern Mozambique. Its natural habitat is subtropical or tropical moist lowland forests.
