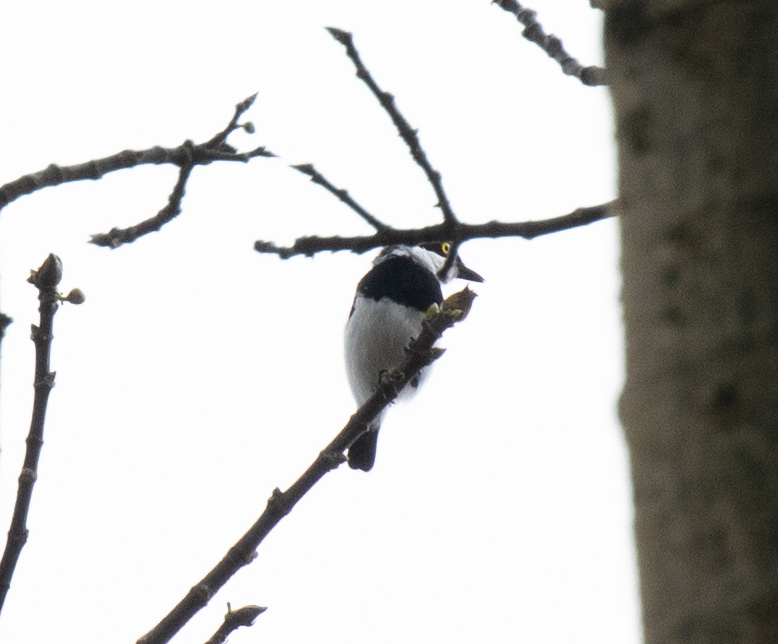

Conservation status
- Least Concern (IUCN 3.1)

Scientific classification
- Kingdom: Animalia
- Phylum: Chordata
- Class: Aves
- Order: Passeriformes
- Family: Platysteiridae
- Genus: Batis
- Species: B. ituriensis

Binomial name
- Batis ituriensis Chapin, 1921

= Ituri batis =

Species of bird

The Ituri batis or Chapin's batis (Batis ituriensis) is a species of bird in the wattle-eye family, Platysteiridae which is found in the humid forests of eastern central Africa.

== Description ==
The Ituri batis is a very small black and white bird, like a small shrike or old world flycatcher which is white below with a broad black breast band, a black head with a conspicuous white loral spot in front of a bright yellow eye. Black on the back and wings with a white strip on the wings and white outer tail feathers on an otherwise black tail. The female is similar to the male but has a thin white supercilium. Young birds are buffer above and greyer below. The Ituri batis has a body length of 9.5–10 cm (3.7–3.9 in).

== Distribution and habitat ==
The Ituri batis occurs in the eastern Congo Basin in Ituri and Itombwe in the north eastern Democratic Republic of Congo where it is uncommon and in the Budongo Forest in western Uganda where it is common.

The Ituri batis is found in lowland forest, between 900 and 1,300 m (3,000 and 4,300 ft). It prefers degraded forest such as secondary forest, and cultivated areas with scattered tall trees, such as plantations, and avoiding primary rainforest.

== Habits ==
Little known but expected to be territorial and rather solitary like other batises, although groups of six birds have been recorded. A restless and active bird which forages high within the canopies of trees. The breeding biology is unknown except that, males have been recorded as feeding the female in March in Uganda, nestlings have been recorded in June and there is indirect evidence of breeding from February to August.
