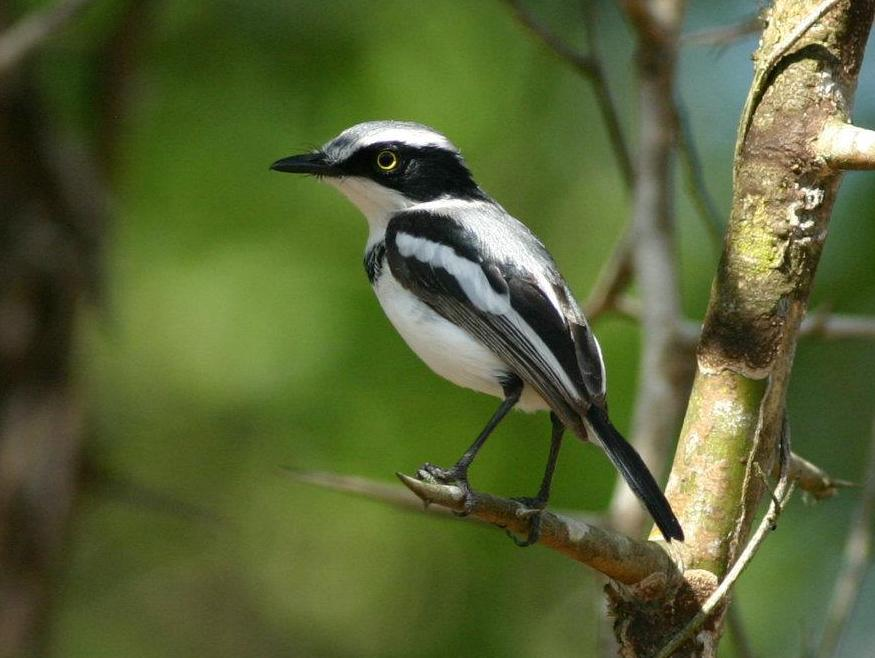
- male
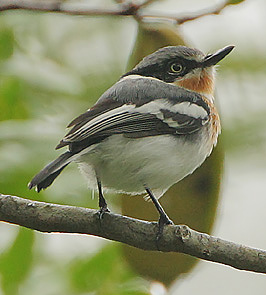
- female

Conservation status
- Least Concern (IUCN 3.1)

Scientific classification
- Kingdom: Animalia
- Phylum: Chordata
- Class: Aves
- Order: Passeriformes
- Family: Platysteiridae
- Genus: Batis
- Species: B. soror

Binomial name
- Batis soror Reichenow, 1903

= Pale batis =

Species of bird

The pale batis (Batis soror), also known as the Mozambique batis or East coast batis, is a species of small bird in the wattle-eyes family, Platysteiridae. It occurs in eastern Africa, mostly in lowland miombo woodland.

== Description ==
The pale batis is an active, black, white and grey bird which is pale grey above with a black face mask bordered by a thin white supercilium, yellow eye and a pale grey back, mottled with faint white spots. It has white underparts marked with a black band across the breast in males; females have a pale rufous breast band and a similar coloured spot on the chin. The bill and legs are black. Immature birds are similar to the female except that the breast band is browner and the underparts have a buffy wash. The pale batis measures 10.5–11.5 cm (4.1–4.5 in) in length and weighs 8–13.1 g (0.28–0.46 oz).

=== Voice ===
The territorial call of the pale batis is a repeated, mournful, long and piping 3-note "pook pook pook" which is repeated up to 12 times at a constant rate, with which the female duets giving excited "wik-wik" calls. Otherwise the repertoire consists of typical batis bill snaps, churrs and whistles.

== Distribution ==
Eastern Africa from coastal Kenya including the Arabuko Sokoke National Park south through eastern and south-eastern Tanzania, the islands of Zanzibar and Mafia, to Mozambique as far south as the Save River, inland to south eastern Malawi, and the east-facing slopes of the Eastern Highlands of Zimbabwe.

== Habitat ==
The pale batis typically occurs in lowland miombo woodland, normally below 500 m (1,600 ft) in coastal woodlands where there is a mosaic of forest and dense scrub. Can also be found in mopane and acacia around the edges of its distribution. In the Eastern Highlands of Zimbabwe it is found up to 1,500 m (4,900 ft) above sea level in tall Uapaca kirkiana stands, thickets of Philippia spp. and woodland dominated mountain acacia.

== Habits ==
Little is known about the feeding habits of the pale batis, other than that it forages by gleaning insects from leaves and branches, it occasionally gleans while hovering and it often joins mixed foraging parties. Its social behaviour is probably similar to other batises in that it is not normally seen in groups larger than pairs or family groups, although the males may gather in single sex aggregations known as "parliaments" immediately prior to the breeding season, when they fly about excitedly, snapping their bills, fripping their wings and making "wik" calls. The male has a zigzag courtship display flight which he performs along with wing fripping, tail fanning and fluffing up the long, white spotted rump feathers while giving strident "week-week-week" calls. The females joins in the calls with her own excited "wik-wik" call.

The nest of the pale batis is a small, deep cup built of thin strips of Combretum bark and fragments of grass inflorescences, held together with spiders webs. The nest is normally situated in the fork of a branch which is at least 6 m (20 ft) above the ground, a small clutch of about 1–2 eggs is usually laid during the period September–November. The female is responsible for all of the incubation and initially she carries out all the feeding of the young, the male joins in feeding when the chicks are older. Only the immediate vicinity of the nest is defended.
