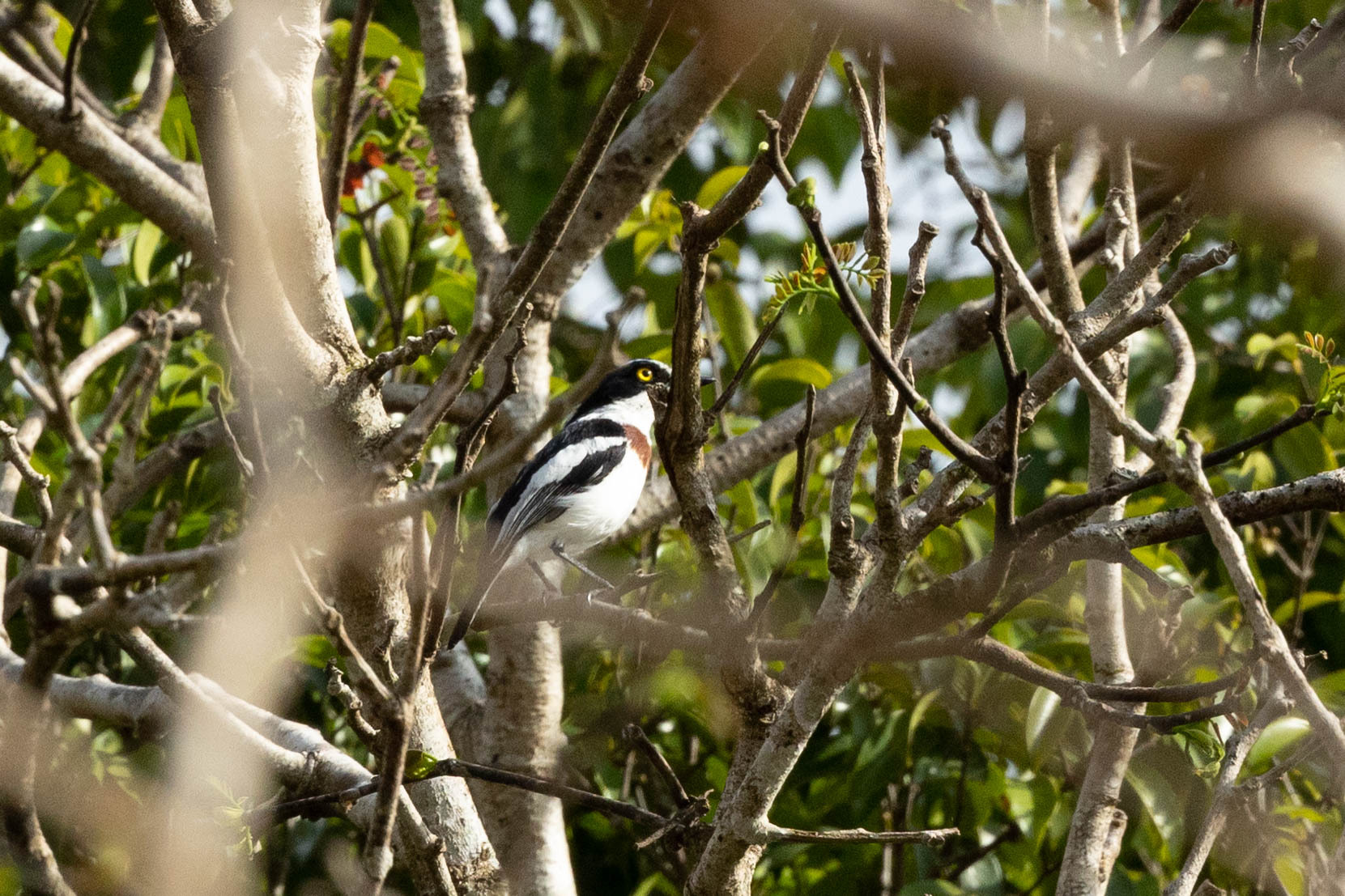

Conservation status
- Least Concern (IUCN 3.1)

Scientific classification
- Kingdom: Animalia
- Phylum: Chordata
- Class: Aves
- Order: Passeriformes
- Family: Platysteiridae
- Genus: Batis
- Species: B. minor

Binomial name
- Batis minor Erlanger, 1901

= Eastern black-headed batis =

Species of bird

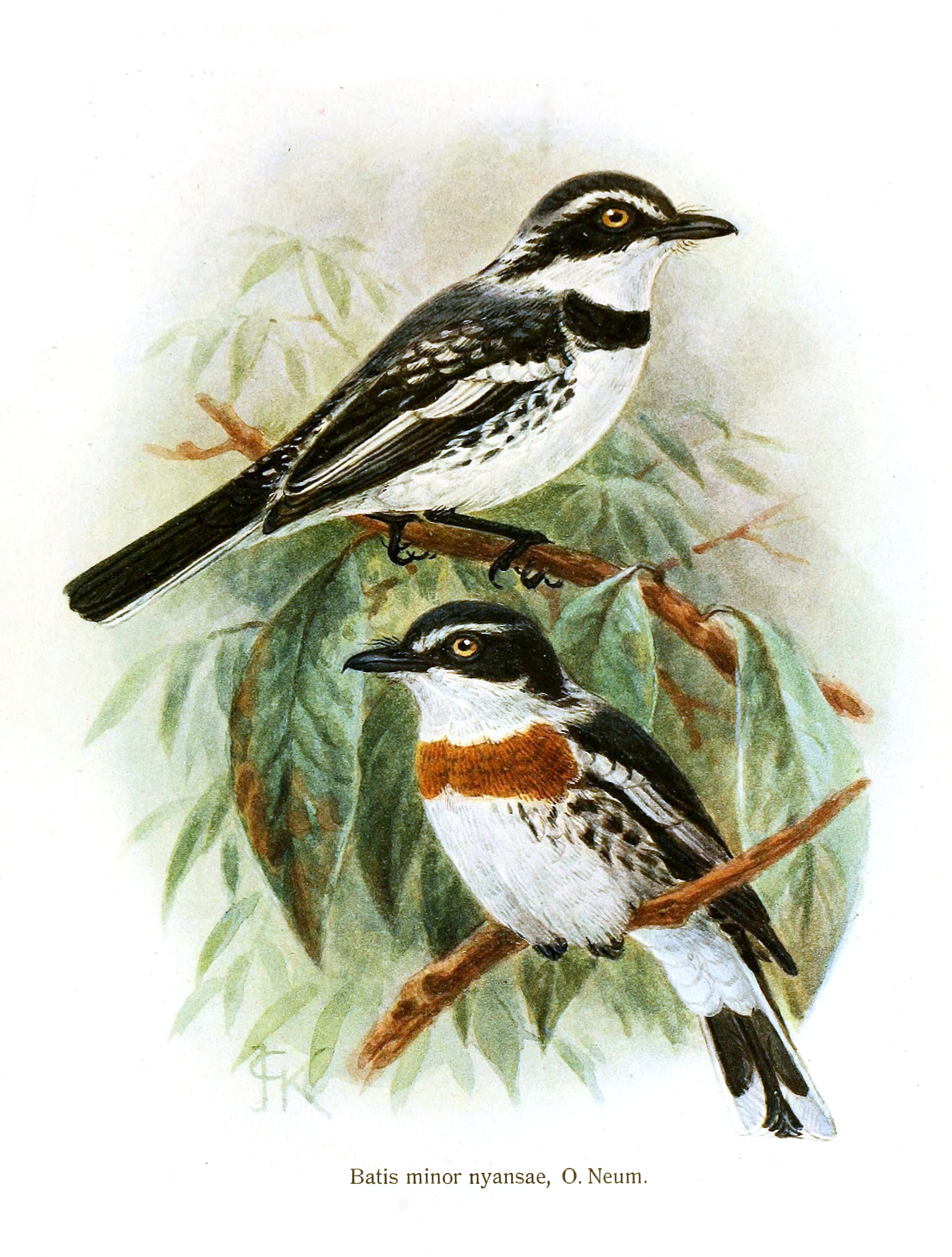
Batis minor

The eastern black-headed batis (Batis minor) is a passerine bird in the family Platysteiridae from eastern Africa. It was formerly treated as conspecific with the western black-headed batis.

== Taxonomy ==
The eastern black-headed batis was described by the German ornithologist Carlo von Erlanger in 1901 who considered the taxon as a subspecies of the grey-headed batis (Batis orientalis) and introduced the trinomial name Batis orientalis minor.

Two subspecies are recognised:

- B. m. minor Erlanger, 1901 – southern Somalia
- B. m. suahelica Neumann, 1907 – southeastern Kenya and eastern Tanzania

== Description ==
The eastern black-headed batis is 10 cm (3.9 in) in length and weighs 9.3–13.8 g (0.33–0.49 oz). It is a small, stocky, rather restless, flycatcher like bird with a white, black and grey plumage. The forehead, crown and nape are blackish grey with a white supercilium and loral spot, the mask is glossy bluish black and there is a white spot on the nape. The mantle and back are dark grey with a paler rump, females have a greyer mantle. The underparts are white with a glossy black breast band, which is dark reddish brown in the females. The tail is black with white outer tail feathers while the wings are mainly black with a white stripe. The bill and legs are black and the eyes are yellow. Juveniles are similar to females but browner.

== Distribution and habitat ==
The eastern black-headed batis occurs in a wide variety of habitats so long as trees are present. These vary from arid savannah woodlands through to juniper on the edge of montane evergreen forest, and including parks and gardens.

== Behaviour ==
The eastern black-headed batis' biology is little known, they are seemingly typical batises and live in pairs or small family groups. Its diet is insects which it forages for by searching foliage or flycatching.
