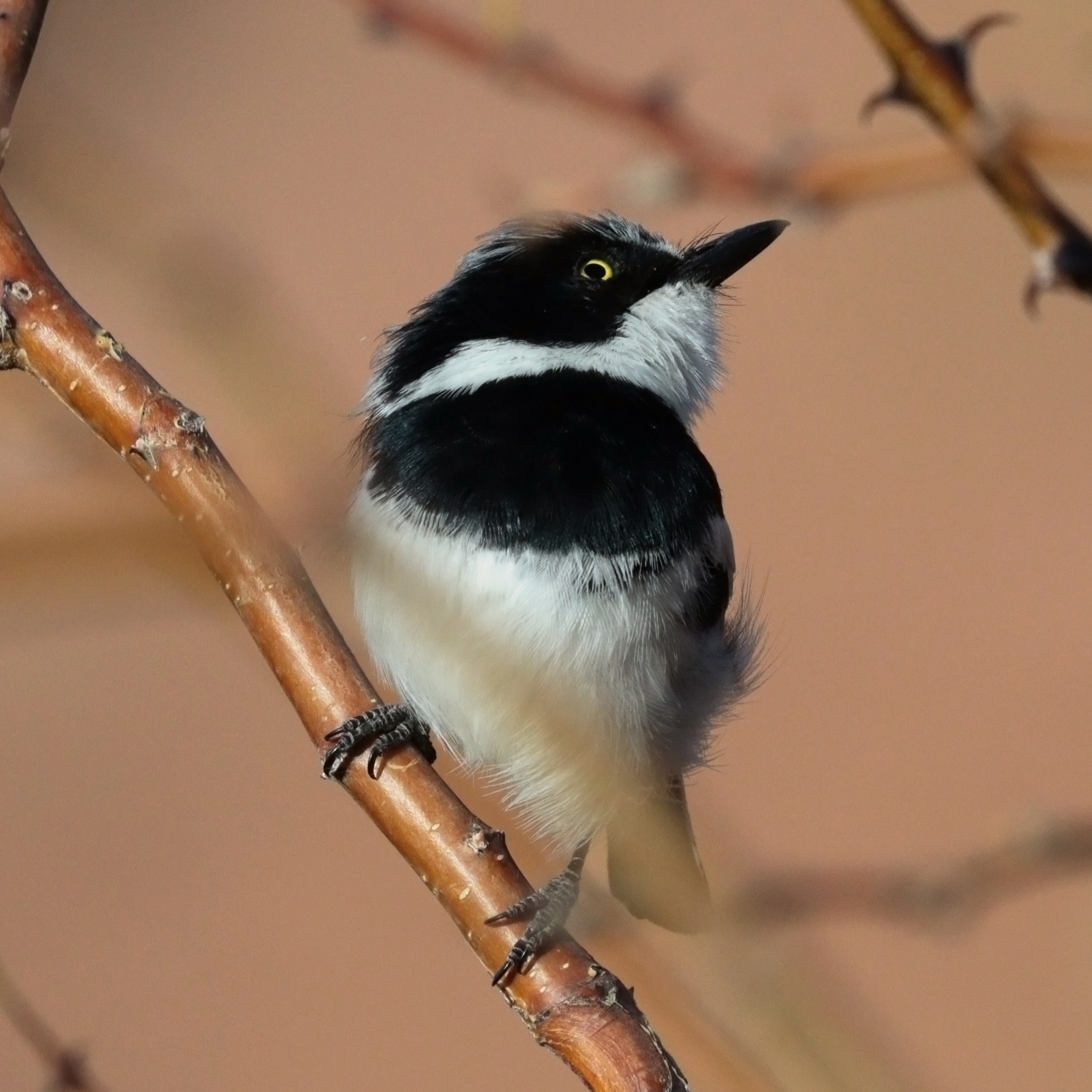
- Male B. p. affinis Damaraland, Namibia
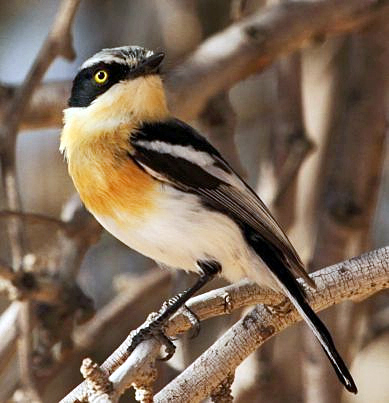
- Female in Northern Cape, South Africa

Conservation status
- Least Concern (IUCN 3.1)

Scientific classification
- Kingdom: Animalia
- Phylum: Chordata
- Class: Aves
- Order: Passeriformes
- Family: Platysteiridae
- Genus: Batis
- Species: B. pririt

Binomial name
- Batis pririt (Vieillot, 1818)

= Pririt batis =

Species of bird

The pririt batis (Batis pririt) also known as the pririt puff-back flycatcher or pririt puffback, is a small passerine bird in the wattle-eye family. It is resident in Southern Africa and southwestern Angola.

It is a small stout insect-eating bird, found in dry broadleaf woodland and thorn scrub. The nest is a small neat cup low in a tree or bush.

The pririt batis is strikingly patterned. The adult male has a dark grey crown and back, black eye mask and white throat. It has a black rump and tail, and its wing are black with white edging to the flight feathers and a long white shoulder patch. The underparts are white with a broad black breast band and black speckles on the flanks. The female and juvenile plumages differ in that there is no black breast band, but the throat and breast are a warm buff colour.

The pririt batis hunts by flycatching, or by taking prey from the ground like a shrike. The song is typically a slow descending series of whistled notes: teuu, teuu, teuu, teuu.
