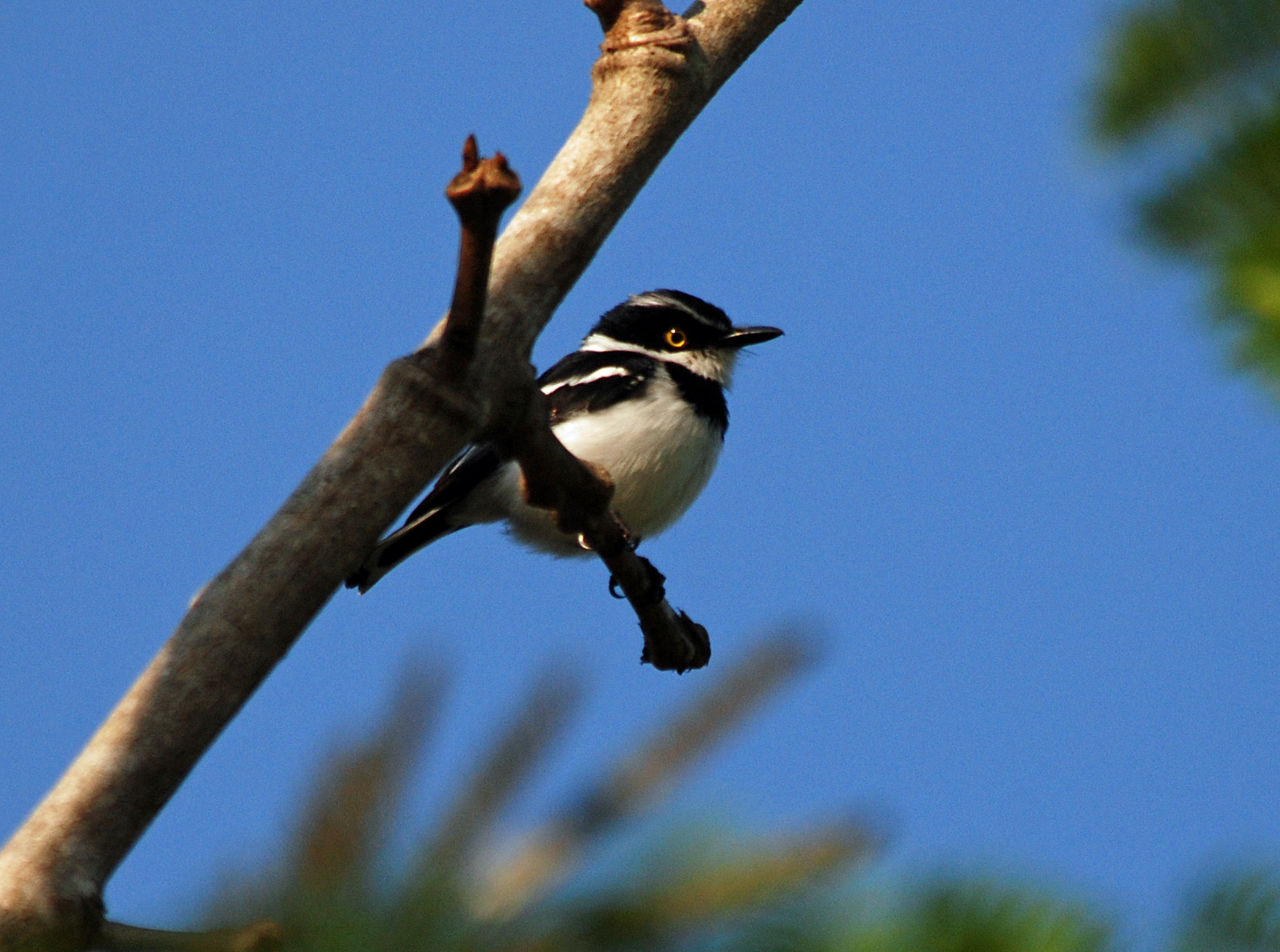

Conservation status
- Least Concern (IUCN 3.1)

Scientific classification
- Kingdom: Animalia
- Phylum: Chordata
- Class: Aves
- Order: Passeriformes
- Family: Platysteiridae
- Genus: Batis
- Species: B. erlangeri

Binomial name
- Batis erlangeri Neumann, 1907

Synonyms
- Batis minor erlangeri

= Western black-headed batis =

Species of bird

The western black-headed batis (Batis erlangeri) or Von Erlanger's batis, is a species of passerine bird in the wattle-eye family Platysteiridae. It is found over an extensive area of central Africa. Its natural habitats are subtropical or tropical dry forests and moist savanna. It was formerly treated as conspecific with the eastern black-headed batis (Batis minor).

Two subspecies are recognised:

- B. e. erlangeri Neumann, 1907 – north Cameroon to Ethiopia south to Uganda, west Kenya and Burundi
- B. e. congoensis Neumann, 1907 – south Congo, southwest Democratic Republic of the Congo, west Angola
