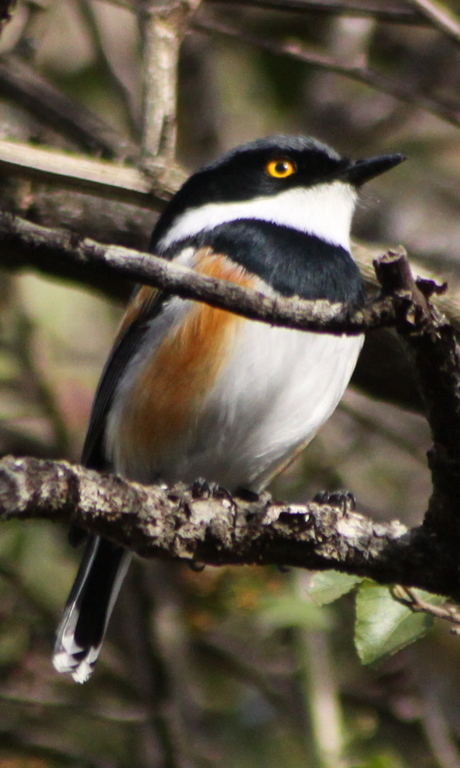
- Male in KwaZulu-Natal, South Africa
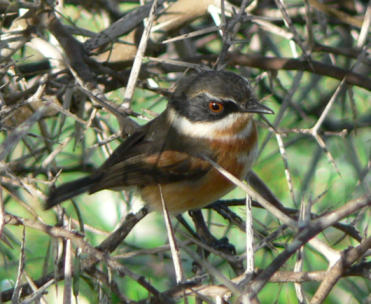
- Female in the Western Cape, South Africa

Conservation status
- Least Concern (IUCN 3.1)

Scientific classification
- Kingdom: Animalia
- Phylum: Chordata
- Class: Aves
- Order: Passeriformes
- Family: Platysteiridae
- Genus: Batis
- Species: B. capensis

Binomial name
- Batis capensis (Linnaeus, 1766)

Synonyms
- Muscicapa capensis Linnaeus, 1766

= Cape batis =

Species of bird

The Cape batis (Batis capensis) is a small, stout insect-eating passerine bird in the wattle-eye family. It is endemic to the Afromontane forests of southern Africa.

== Taxonomy ==
In 1760 the French zoologist Mathurin Jacques Brisson included a description of the Cape batis in his Ornithologie based on a specimen collected from the Cape of Good Hope in South Africa. He used the French name Le gobe-mouche du Cap de Bonne Espérance and the Latin Muscicapa Bonae Spei. Although Brisson coined Latin names, these do not conform to the binomial system and are not recognised by the International Commission on Zoological Nomenclature. When in 1766 the Swedish naturalist Carl Linnaeus updated his Systema Naturae for the twelfth edition, he added 240 species that had been previously described by Brisson. One of these was the Cape batis. Linnaeus included a brief description, coined the binomial name Muscicapa capensis and cited Brisson's work. The specific name capensis denotes the Cape of Good Hope. The species is now placed in the genus Batis that was introduced by the German zoologist Friedrich Boie in 1833.

Five subspecies are recognised.

- B. c. sola Lawson, 1964 – northern Malawi
- B. c. kennedyi Smithers & Paterson, 1956 – western to central Zimbabwe
- B. c. erythrophthalma Swynnerton, 1907 – Eastern Highlands in Zimbabwe and Mozambique
- B. c. hollidayi Clancey, 1952 – Waterberg, Soutpansberg, northern Drakensberg and southern Lebombos in South Africa and Mozambique
- B. c. capensis (Linnaeus, 1766) – Western Cape to Lesotho and upland KwaZulu-Natal, South Africa

== Description ==
The Cape batis is strikingly patterned. The adult male has a grey crown, black eye mask and white throat. Its back is brown, with a black rump and tail and rufous wings. The underparts are white with a broad black breast band and rufous flanks. The female and juvenile plumages differ in that the breast band is narrower and rufous, not black, and there is a small rufous patch on the throat. Their rufous wings and flanks distinguish them from other Batis species in the region.

The males of the two Malawian subspecies (B. c. dimorpha and B. c. sola) differ in having colder tones to the upper part and flank plumages (lacking any rufous or olive), besides having shorter bills, and are sometimes separated as the Malawi batis (Batis dimorpha). The population of Mount Namuli may represent a third subspecies of this northerly taxon.

The song is typically a triple whistle cherra-warra-warra or foo-foo-foo.

== Distribution and habitat ==
It is resident in cool coastal forests, moist evergreen mountain forests and wooded gorges. It is native to South Africa, Eswatini, the Matobos and Eastern Highlands of Zimbabwe and adjacent Mozambique.

== Behaviour ==
Both the male and the female will aggressively defend their territory. When larger birds of prey, animals or humans approach, the bird will often perch conspicuously near the intruder and angrily protest audibly. The Cape batis hunts by flycatching, or by taking prey from the ground like a shrike. The nest is a small neat cup low in a tree or bush.

== Gallery ==
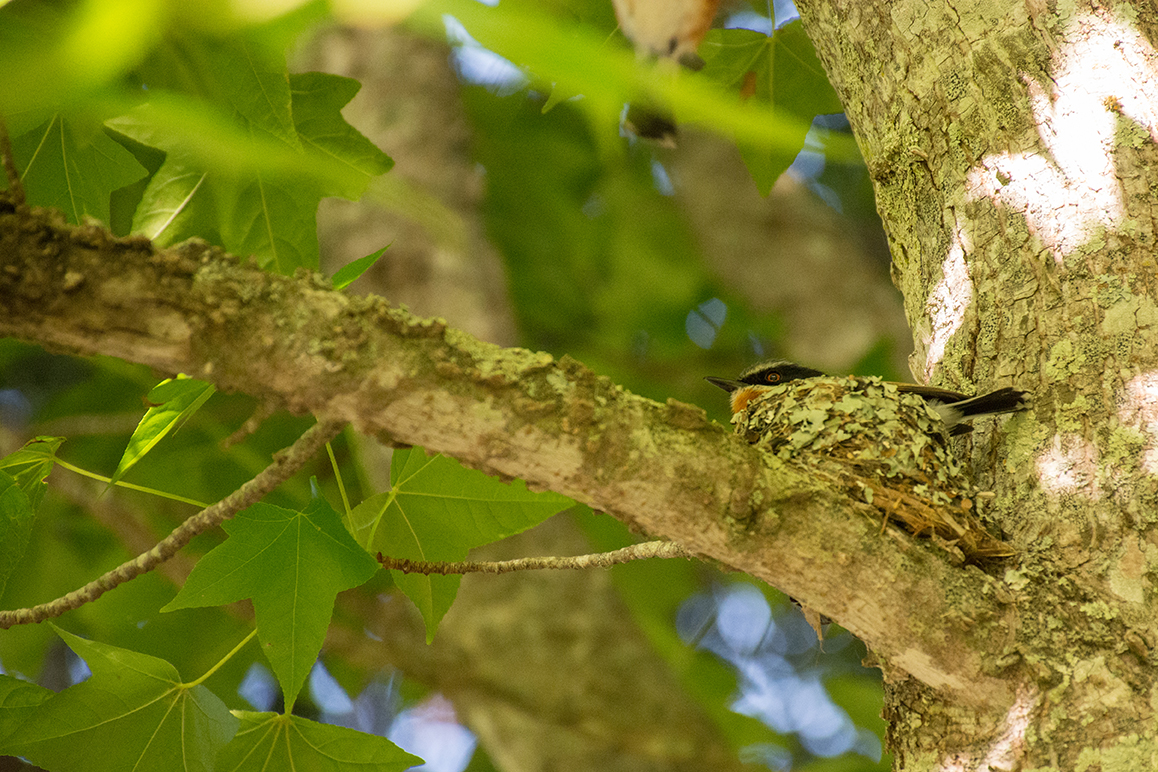
Female Cape Batis Incubating
