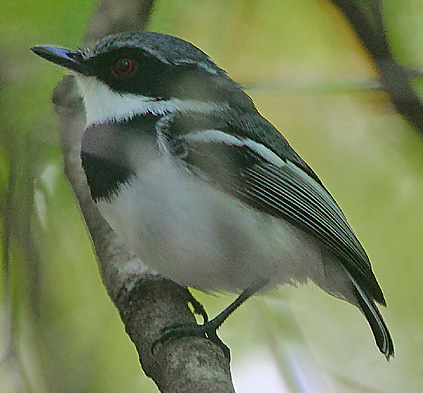
- Male

Conservation status
- Least Concern (IUCN 3.1)

Scientific classification
- Kingdom: Animalia
- Phylum: Chordata
- Class: Aves
- Order: Passeriformes
- Family: Platysteiridae
- Genus: Batis
- Species: B. mixta

Binomial name
- Batis mixta (Shelley, 1889)

= Short-tailed batis =

Species of bird

The short-tailed batis or the forest batis (Batis mixta) is a species of bird in the wattle-eye family, Platysteiridae occurring in eastern Africa.

== Taxonomy ==
The short-tailed batis was formally described and illustrated by the English ornithologist George Ernest Shelley in 1889 and given the binomial name Pachypora mixta. It is now one of 20 species placed in the genus Batis that was introduced by the German zoologist Friedrich Boie in 1833. The specific epithet mixta is Latin for "mixed" or "mingled".

Two subspecies are recognised:

- B. m. mixta (Shelley, 1889) – southeast Kenya to northeast Tanzania
- B. m. reichenowi Grote, 1911 – southeast Tanzania

The subspecies B. m. reichenowi has sometimes been considered as a separate species, Reichenow's batis. Although the plumage of Reichenow's batis is distinctive, an analysis of mitochondrial DNA sequences published in 2006 found that the DNA from specimens of Reichenow's batis were nested within sequences of the forest batis.

== Description ==
The short-tailed batis is a small species measuring 9.5–10 cm (3.7–3.9 in) in length and weighing 10.5–14.2 g (0.37–0.50 oz). The adult male has bluish grey upperparts with a black mask across the face, a white spot on the lores and white spots on the rump which are revealed when the long feathers are fluffed out. The underparts are white with a black breast band and blackish thighs. The wings are black with a white stripe, the bill and legs are black while the eyes are red. Females are similar in pattern but the upper part colour is more olive in tone, the wings more reddish brown and has a mottled rufous breast band and browner wings. Juveniles similar to female but markings less well differentiated. The short black tail is edged with white.

== Distribution and habitat ==
The short-tailed batis is found in east Africa from the south eastern coast of Kenya and north eastern Tanzania including Mount Kilimanjaro, along the northern Eastern Arc Mountains of Tanzania, i.e. Nguru, Nguu, Usambara Mountains, Pare and Kilimanjaro. It is also found in coastal south eastern Tanzania.

The short-tailed batis is found in coastal forest, miombo woodland and in montane forest from sea level up to 2,300 m (7,500 ft) on Kilimanjaro. It frequents the lower levels of forest and the undergrowth.

== Behaviour ==
The habits of the short-tailed batis are little known, there have been indications of breeding behaviour in May and June in Kenya, September and October in Tanzania and a single nest with a clutch of 2 eggs has been recorded. Like other batises the largest groups seen are small family groups and pairs are territorial. Calling males make a repetitive, slow series of hu-hu-hu-hu whistles and they puff their white throat feathers out while performing this song.
