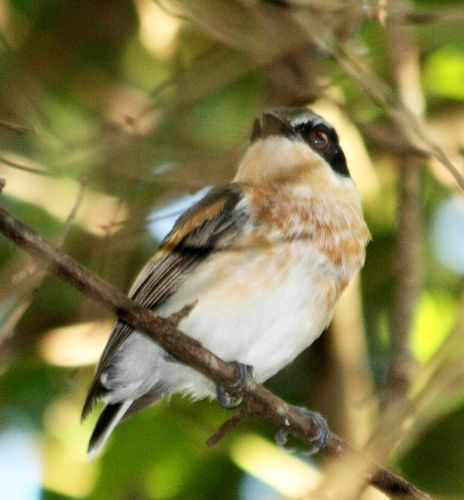
- A female at Cape Vidal, KwaZulu-Natal, South Africa

Conservation status
- Least Concern (IUCN 3.1)

Scientific classification
- Kingdom: Animalia
- Phylum: Chordata
- Class: Aves
- Order: Passeriformes
- Family: Platysteiridae
- Genus: Batis
- Species: B. fratrum

Binomial name
- Batis fratrum (Shelley, 1900)

= Woodwards' batis =

Species of bird

Woodwards' batis (Batis fratrum) or the Zululand batis, is a species of small bird in the wattle-eyes family, Platysteiridae. It occurs in southeastern Africa where it is found in woodlands and forests.

== Taxonomy ==
A description of Woodwards' batis by the English ornithologist George Ernest Shelley was included as a footnote in an article on birds from Lake St. Lucia in South Africa by the English missionaries and farmers Richard and John Woodward (the Woodward brothers) published in 1900. Shelley coined the binomial name Pachypora fratrum. The specific name fratrum is Latin for "of the brothers". Woodwards' batis is now placed in the genus Batis that was introduced by the German zoologist Friedrich Boie in 1833. The species is monotypic.

== Description ==
Woodwards' batis is 10.5 cm (4.1 in) in length and weighs 10.3–13.8 g (0.36–0.49 oz). It is a small active bird which is similar to a flycatcher and shows the typical patterns and plumage colours of the genus Batis. It is blue-grey above with a short white supercilium, black mask on the face, an orange-red eyes and the tail is black with the outer tail feathers edged white and all of the tail feathers except the middle two are tipped with white.

It is sexually dimorphic and the male shows white on the wing strip, chin and throat while his breast and upper belly are pale rufous. The female has a browner more olive grey upperparts, pale reddish brown wing stripe and underparts while juveniles are similar but with an indistinct face mask. The bill and the legs are black.

== Distribution and habitat ==
Woodwards' batis is endemic to southeastern Africa from the extreme north east of KwaZulu Natal in South Africa, north along coastal northern Mozambique and southern Malawi and inland to the remnant forests of south eastern Zimbabwe.

Woodwards' batis prefers lowland and evergreen forest as well as dense acacia woodland, sand forest, riparian forest and miombo woodland. In Malawi its range extends up to 600 m (2,000 ft).

== Behaviour ==
Woodwards' batis actively and continuously forages throughout the day, capturing insect prey by gleaning it from twigs, leaves and branches, typically while hovering in mid-air.

The nest is the typical batis loosely-constructed shallow cup, made out of rootlets, tendrils, fragments of dead leaves and sometimes lichen, bound together with strands of spider web. Unusually for this genus it is usually placed amongst creepers or leaves and rarely in a tree fork. The 1–3 eggs are laid from October to November and these are probably incubated solely by the female, as with most other batises.
