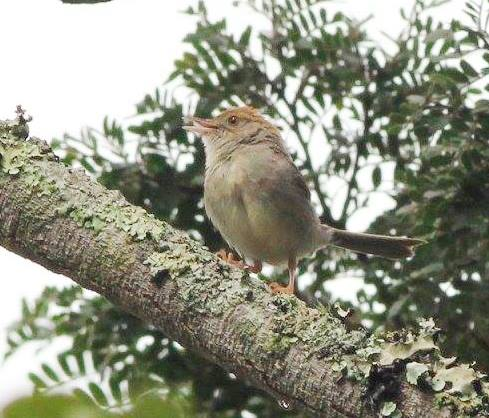
- At source of Cuanavale River, Angola

Conservation status
- Least Concern (IUCN 3.1)

Scientific classification
- Kingdom: Animalia
- Phylum: Chordata
- Class: Aves
- Order: Passeriformes
- Family: Cisticolidae
- Genus: Cisticola
- Species: C. melanurus

Binomial name
- Cisticola melanurus (Cabanis, 1882)

Synonyms
- Cisticola melanurus (Cabanis, 1882) [orth. error]

= Black-tailed cisticola =

Species of bird

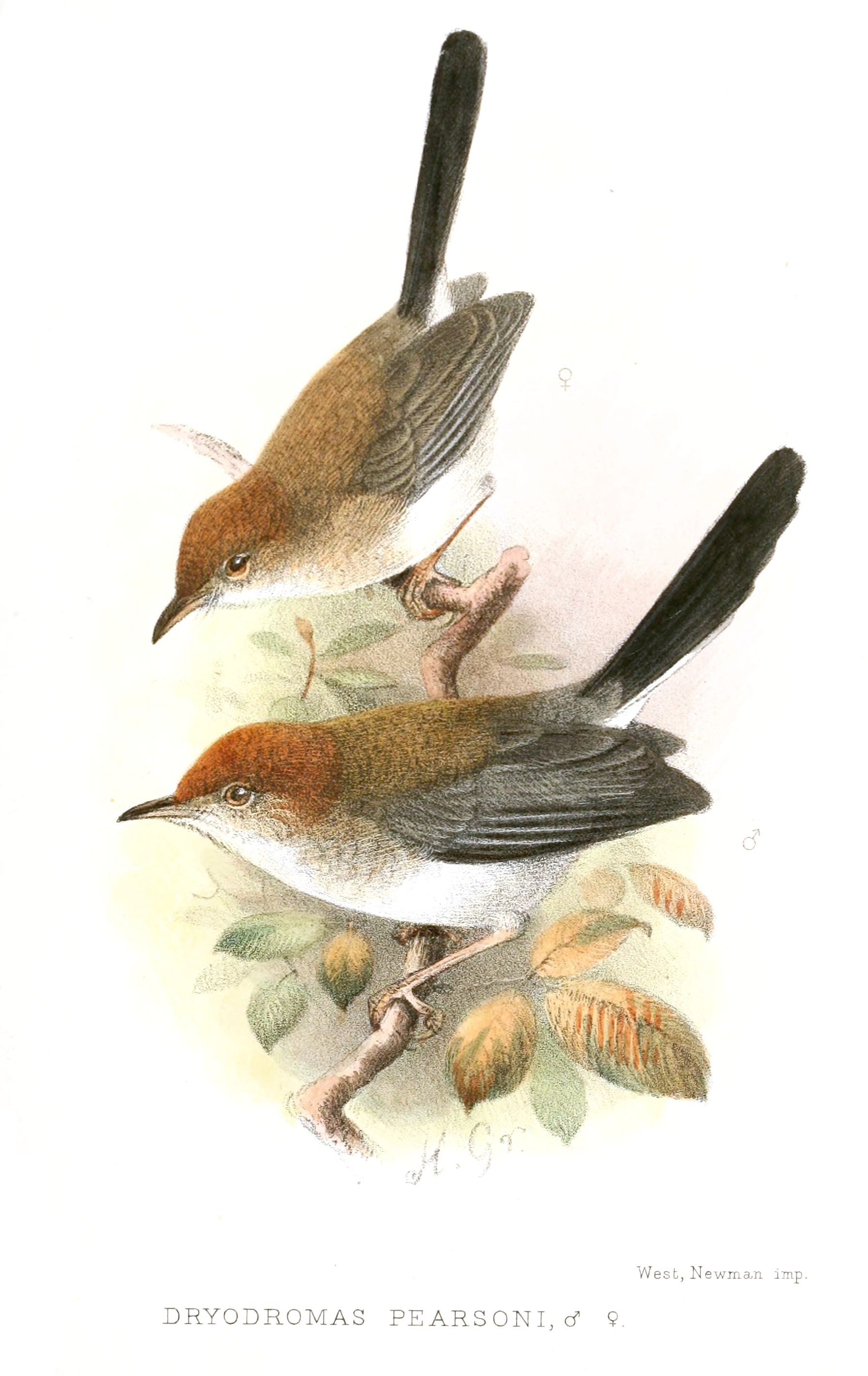

The black-tailed cisticola (Cisticola melanurus), also known as the Slender-tailed cisticola, is a species of bird in the family Cisticolidae found in Angola and Democratic Republic of the Congo. Its natural habitat is dry savanna and the canopy of smaller trees. It forages for insects both in the canopy and on the ground.

== Taxonomy ==
The black-tailed cisticola was described by the German ornithologist Jean Cabanis in 1882 and given the binomial name Dryodromas melanurus. The specific epithet combines the Ancient Greek words melas "black" and oura "tail". The species is now placed in the genus Cisticola which was erected by the German naturalist Johann Jakob Kaup in 1829. The species is monotypic.

== Description ==
The black-tailed cisticola is 10–11 cm (3.9–4.3 in) in length and weighs 8–10 g (0.28–0.35 oz). It has a rich rufous crown, dark grey-brown back and a long black tail. The underparts are whitish. Juveniles are similar to the adults but less brightly coloured. The black-tailed cisticola is similar in appearance to the long-tailed cisticola (Cisticola angusticauda).

In flight the birds sometimes make a clicking sound with their wings.
