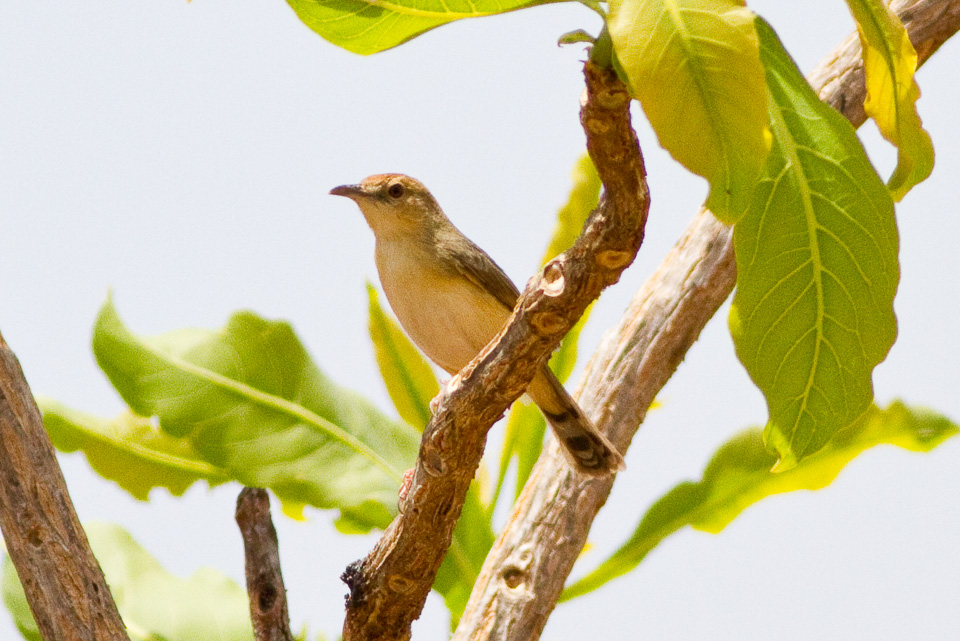
- in Bénoué National Park, Cameroon

Conservation status
- Least Concern (IUCN 3.1)

Scientific classification
- Kingdom: Animalia
- Phylum: Chordata
- Class: Aves
- Order: Passeriformes
- Family: Cisticolidae
- Genus: Cisticola
- Species: C. guinea

Binomial name
- Cisticola guinea Lynes, 1930

Synonyms
- Cisticola dorsti Chappuis & Erard, 1991; Cisticola ruficeps guinea Lynes, 1930

= Dorst's cisticola =

Species of bird

Dorst's cisticola (Cisticola guinea), also known as the plaintive cisticola, is a bird in the family Cisticolidae. It occurs in West Africa and south of Lake Chad.

Taxonomy and systematics of this bird are quite confusing. The Cisticolidae were formerly included in the "Old World warbler" assemblage and placed in the family Sylviidae. Dorst's cisticola was initially named Cisticola dorsti, hence the common name. The name commemorates the French ornithologist Jean Dorst.

Another very similar cisticola had been described some years earlier as a subspecies of the red-pate cisticola (C. ruficeps), and named C. r. guinea. It was eventually discovered that these two taxa were one and the same, and that the song of these birds differs enough from the visually very similar red-pate cisticola for reproductive isolation. Thus, the newly discovered population is usually considered a good species, and the current scientific name is Cisticola guinea, although other taxonomists continue to use dorsti.

Its natural habitat is dry savanna. This little-known bird was formerly classified as data deficient by the IUCN, mainly due to the uncertainty regarding its taxonomic status. New research has shown it to be plentiful and widespread. Consequently, it is listed as a species of least concern in 2008.
