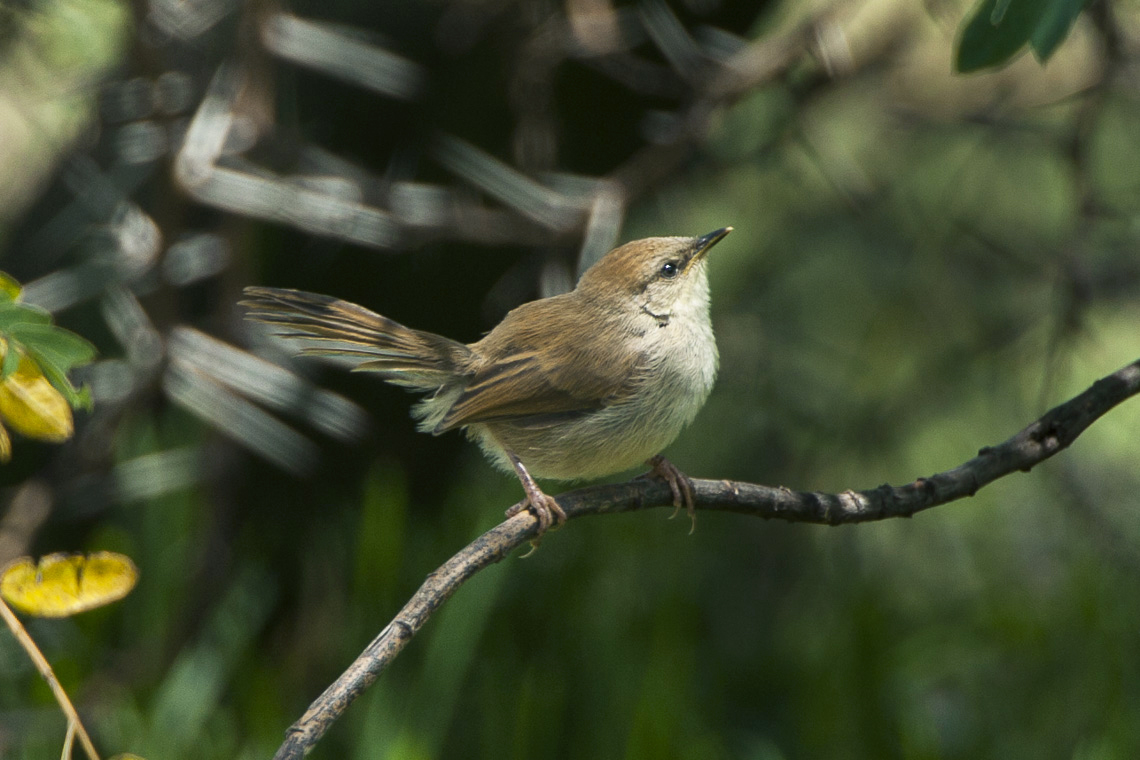
- In Kenya

Conservation status
- Least Concern (IUCN 3.1)

Scientific classification
- Kingdom: Animalia
- Phylum: Chordata
- Class: Aves
- Order: Passeriformes
- Family: Cisticolidae
- Genus: Cisticola
- Species: C. rufilatus

Binomial name
- Cisticola rufilatus (Hartlaub, 1870)

= Tinkling cisticola =

Species of bird

The tinkling cisticola or grey cisticola (Cisticola rufilatus) is a species of bird in the family Cisticolidae. It is found in Angola, Botswana, Republic of the Congo, Democratic Republic of the Congo, Gabon, Malawi, Namibia, South Africa, Zambia, and Zimbabwe. Its natural habitat is dry savannah.

Note that the name tinkling cisticola is also used as an alternative name for Levaillant's cisticola (Cisticola tinniens).
