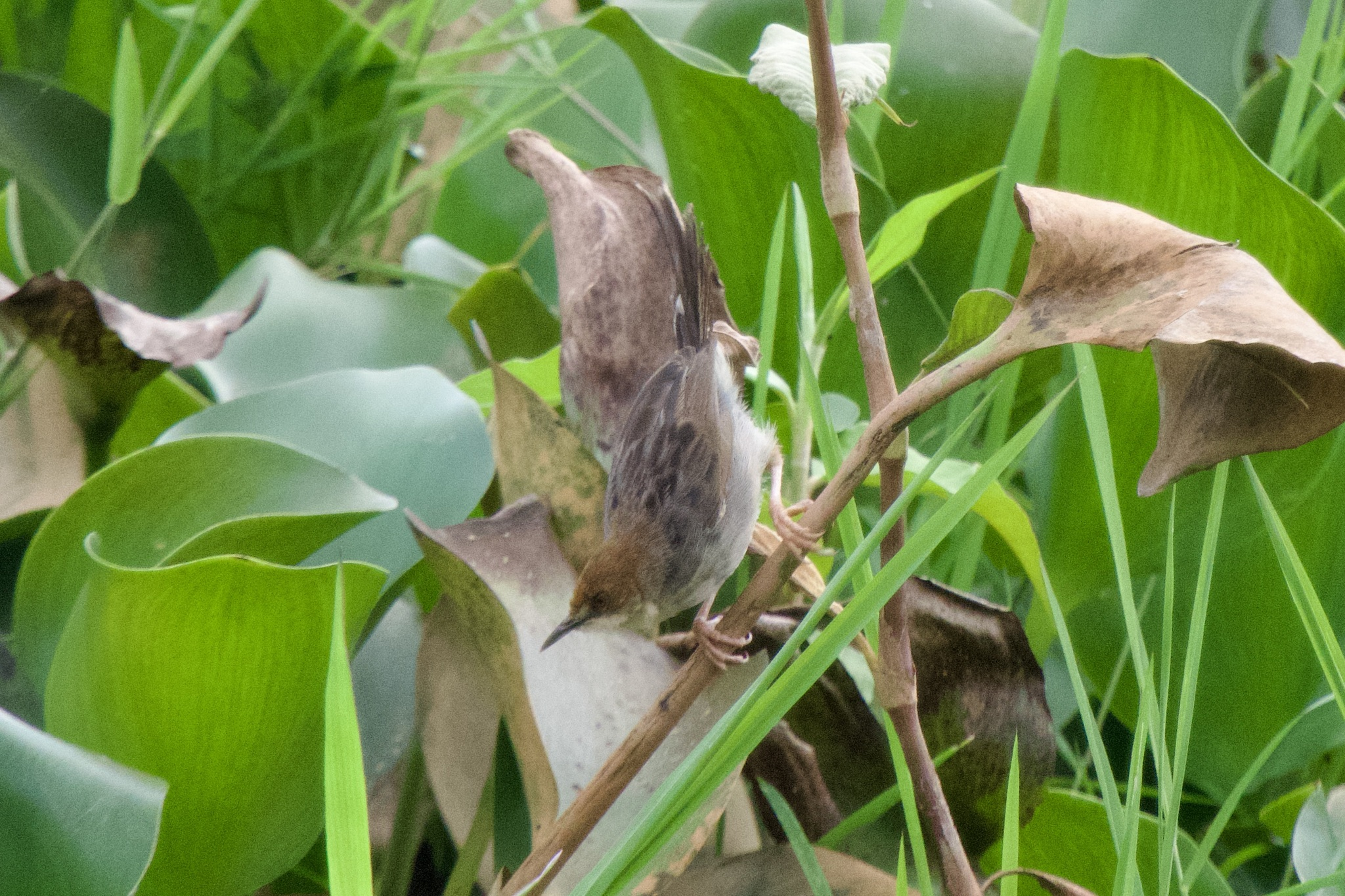

Conservation status
- Least Concern (IUCN 3.1)

Scientific classification
- Kingdom: Animalia
- Phylum: Chordata
- Class: Aves
- Order: Passeriformes
- Family: Cisticolidae
- Genus: Cisticola
- Species: C. carruthersi

Binomial name
- Cisticola carruthersi Ogilvie-Grant, 1909

= Carruthers's cisticola =

Species of bird

Carruthers's cisticola (Cisticola carruthersi) is a species of bird in the family Cisticolidae. It is found in Burundi, Democratic Republic of the Congo, Kenya, Rwanda, Tanzania, and Uganda. Its natural habitat is swamps.
