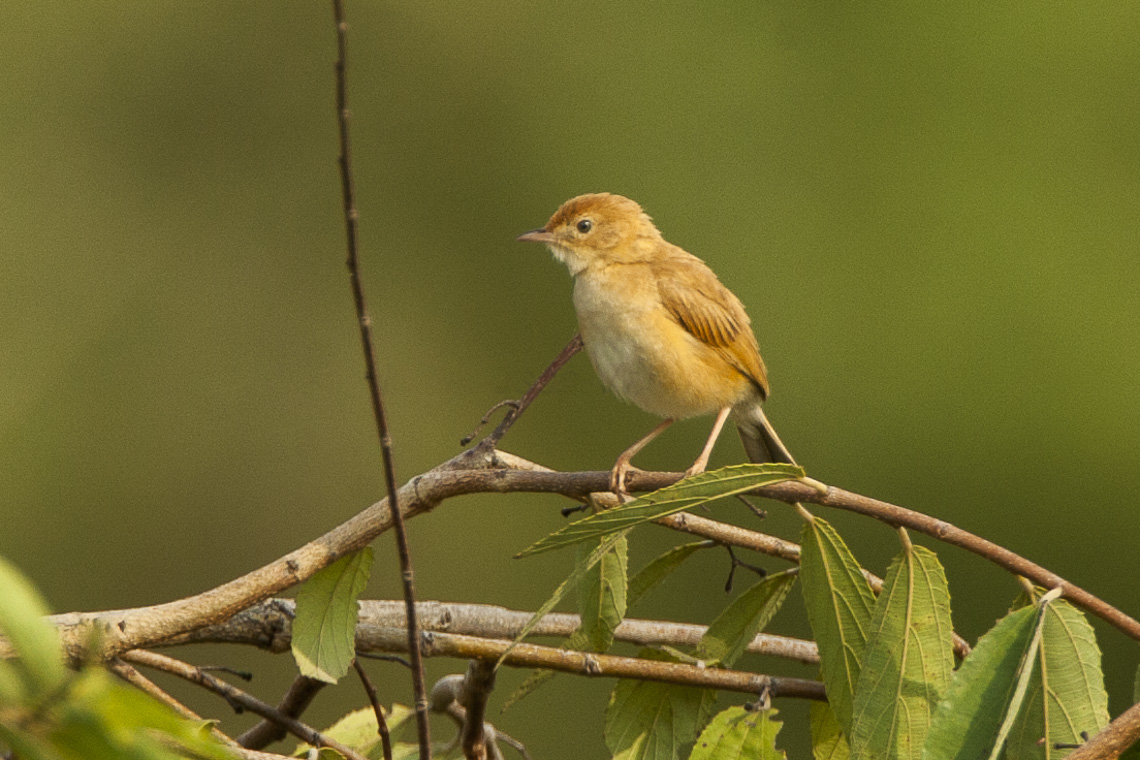
- At Murchison Falls NP, Uganda

Conservation status
- Least Concern (IUCN 3.1)

Scientific classification
- Kingdom: Animalia
- Phylum: Chordata
- Class: Aves
- Order: Passeriformes
- Family: Cisticolidae
- Genus: Cisticola
- Species: C. troglodytes

Binomial name
- Cisticola troglodytes (Antinori, 1864)

= Foxy cisticola =

Species of bird

The foxy cisticola (Cisticola troglodytes) is a species of bird in the family Cisticolidae.

It is native to Central African Republic (Bozoum and Manovo-Gounda St. Floris National Park), Democratic Republic of the Congo (Garamba National Park), Ethiopia (Gambela National Park), Kenya (Mount Elgon), Sudan (Ashana-Bandingilo-Dinder-Imatong Mountains and Juba) and Uganda (Kidepo Valley National Park, Mt Kie Forest, Mt. Moroto Forest Reserve and Mt Otzi Forest Reserve). It is also known to be vagrant to Mali. Its natural habitats are subtropical or tropical dry forest, dry savanna, and subtropical or tropical seasonally wet or flooded lowland grassland.
