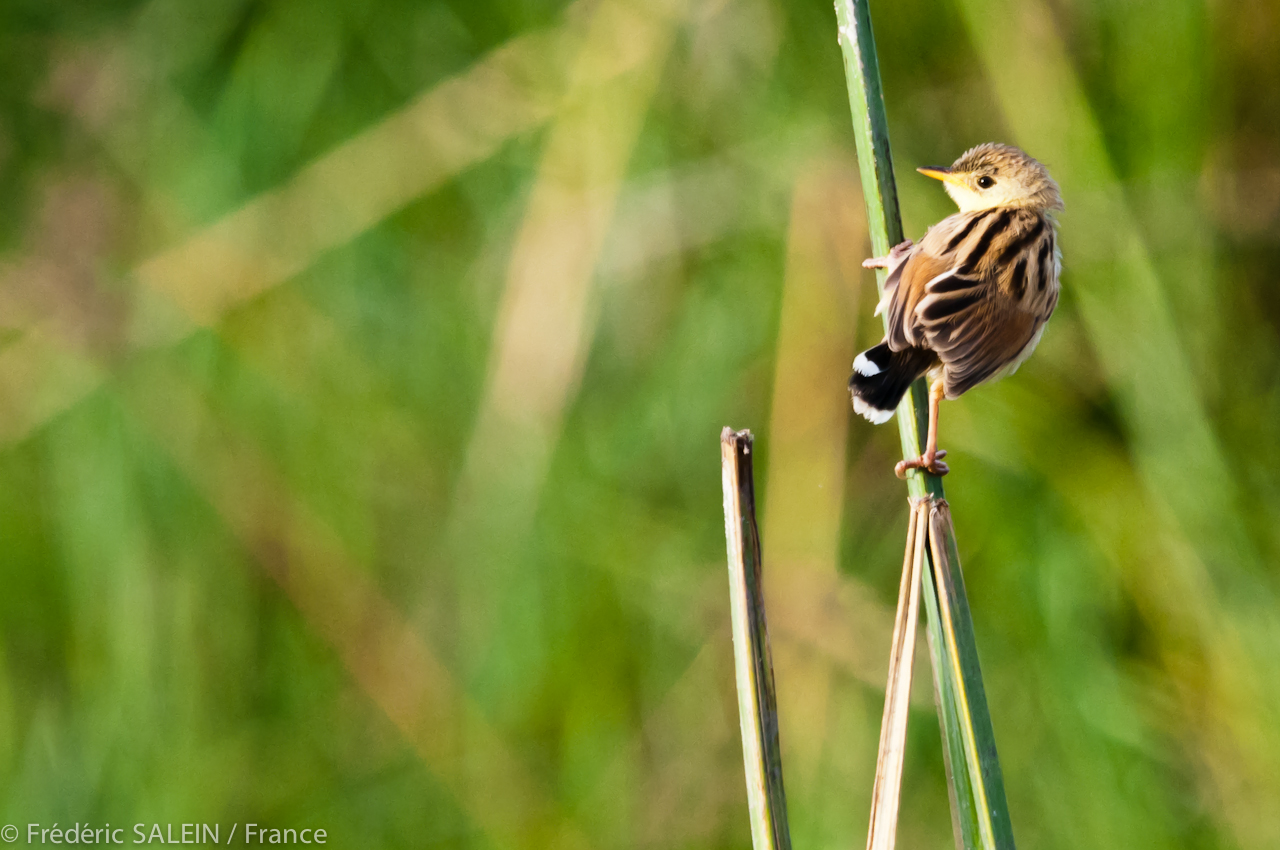

Conservation status
- Least Concern (IUCN 3.1)

Scientific classification
- Kingdom: Animalia
- Phylum: Chordata
- Class: Aves
- Order: Passeriformes
- Family: Cisticolidae
- Genus: Cisticola
- Species: C. cinereolus

Binomial name
- Cisticola cinereolus Salvadori, 1888

Audio
- Song recorded in southwest Kenya

= Ashy cisticola =

Species of bird

The ashy cisticola (Cisticola cinereolus) is a species of bird in the family Cisticolidae. It is found in Ethiopia, Kenya, Somalia, South Sudan, and Tanzania. Its natural habitats are dry savanna, subtropical or tropical dry shrubland, and subtropical or tropical dry lowland grassland.
