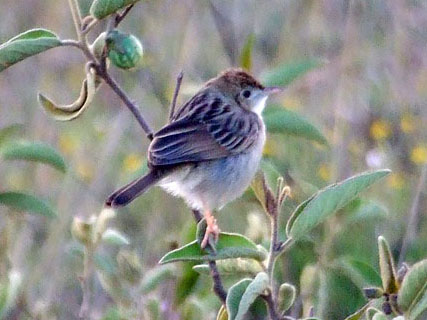
- At Gilgil, Kenya

Conservation status
- Least Concern (IUCN 3.1)

Scientific classification
- Kingdom: Animalia
- Phylum: Chordata
- Class: Aves
- Order: Passeriformes
- Family: Cisticolidae
- Genus: Cisticola
- Species: C. nana

Binomial name
- Cisticola nana Fischer & Reichenow, 1884

Synonyms
- Cisticola nanus

Audio
- Song recorded in Kiboko, Kenya

= Tiny cisticola =

Species of bird

The tiny cisticola (Cisticola nana) is a species of bird in the family Cisticolidae. It is found in Ethiopia, Kenya, Somalia, South Sudan, and Tanzania. Its natural habitats are dry savanna, subtropical or tropical dry shrubland, and subtropical or tropical dry lowland grassland.
