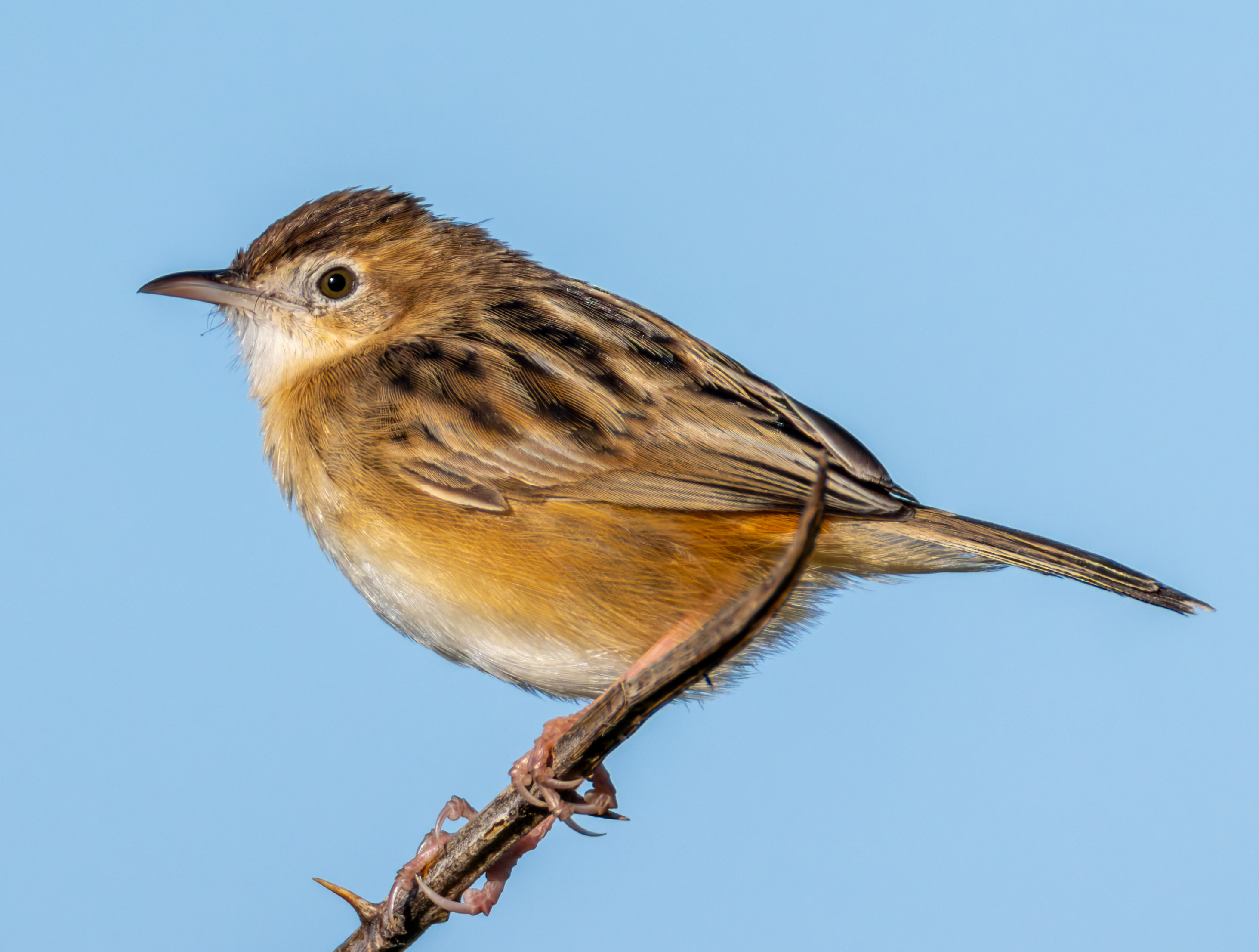
- Zitting cisticola (Cisticola juncidis cisticola)

Scientific classification
- Kingdom: Animalia
- Phylum: Chordata
- Class: Aves
- Order: Passeriformes
- Family: Cisticolidae
- Genus: Cisticola; Kaup, 1829

Type species
- Sylvia cisticola = Cisticola juncidis cisticola Temminck, 1820

Species
- see text

= Cisticola =

Genus of birds

Cisticola is a genus of small insectivorous birds formerly classified in the Old World warbler family Sylviidae, but now usually considered to be in the separate family Cisticolidae, along with other tropical and southern warbler genera. The name is used as both the scientific and vernacular names; it can be pronounced either kis-ti-cola (classical Latin) or sis-tic-ola (ecclesiastical Latin). Genetic data suggests the family is quite closely related to the swallows and martins, the bulbuls, and the white-eyes. The genus contains over 50 species, of which only two are not found in Africa, one in Madagascar and the other from Asia to Australasia. They are also sometimes called fan-tailed warblers due to their habit of conspicuously flicking their tails, or tailor-birds because of their nests.

== Taxonomy ==
The genus was described by the German naturalist Johann Jakob Kaup in 1829. The type species, Sylvia cisticola by tautonymy, is now treated as a subspecies of Cisticola juncidis. The name Cisticola is from Ancient Greek κίσθος kisthos or κίστος kistos, "rock-rose (Cistus)", and Latin colere, "to dwell".

== Range and habitat ==
Cisticolas are widespread through the tropical and subtropical regions of the Old World. Africa, which is home to almost all of the species, is the most likely ancestral home of the group. Cisticolas are usually non-migratory with most species attached to (and often distinguishable by) their habitats.

A variety of open habitats are occupied. These include wetlands, moist or drier grasslands, open or rocky mountain slopes, and human-modified habitats such as road verges, cultivation, weedy areas or pasture. The species preferring wetlands can be found at the edges of mangrove, or in papyrus, common reed, or typha swamps. Cisticolas are generally quite common within what remains of their preferred habitats.

The zitting cisticola (or fan-tailed warbler) is widespread throughout the Old World tropics and also breeds in southern Europe. It has been spreading northwards in western Europe with the warming climate, and has occurred on a few occasions as a vagrant to England, with breeding recorded there for the first time in 2025.

== Description ==
Cisticolas are small (from 9–17 cm) and with brown plumage; they may be either streaked dark brown on lighter brown above, or more plainly uniform brown above. The underparts are paler, usually whitish or buff. The tails are distinctively short in several species. Because of their small size and often skulking, they are generally more easily heard than seen, except when singing in flight. Several have more brightly coloured crowns, orange-brown to golden, to (rarely) white. The similar plumage of many species can make them hard to identify, particularly in winter when they seldom emerge from the vegetation. Many African species, in particular, are difficult to distinguish other than by their calls. Fourteen species are named from their calls or songs, from "singing" and "chirping" to "bubbling", "croaking", "rattling", "siffling", "tinkling", "trilling", "wailing", and "zitting". The sexes are largely alike in plumage or with small differences mainly in the bill colour and amount of streaking on the head, but many show sexual dimorphism in size, with the males heavier than the females.

The smallest is tiny cisticola at 9–10 cm long and 5–10 g weight, the largest is croaking cisticola at 13–17 cm long and 12–29 g (male 16–29 g, female 12–18 g) weight.

== Behaviour ==
Male cisticolas are polygamous. The female builds a discreet nest deep in the grasses, often binding living leaves into the soft fabric of felted plant down, cobweb, and grass: a cup shape for the zitting cisticola with a canopy of tied-together leaves or grasses overhead for camouflage, a full dome for the golden-headed cisticola. The average clutch is about 4 eggs, which take about 2 weeks to hatch.

In summer, male cisticolas of smaller species make spectacular display flights while larger species perch in prominent places to sing lustily. Despite its size and well-camouflaged, brown-streaked plumage, the male golden-headed cisticola of Australia and southern Asia produces a small, brilliant splash of golden-yellow colour in the dappled sunlight of a reed bed.

The parasitic weaver is a specialist brood parasite of cisticolas and the related prinias.

== List of species ==
The genus contains 53 species:

Image	Common name	Scientific name	Distribution
	Red-faced cisticola	Cisticola erythrops	Sub-Saharan Africa (except southern and Horn of Africa)
	Singing cisticola	Cisticola cantans	Sub-Saharan Africa
	Whistling cisticola	Cisticola lateralis	African tropical rainforest
	Trilling cisticola	Cisticola woosnami	Zambia, Tanzania, DR Congo, western Kenya
	Chattering cisticola	Cisticola anonymus	central Africa
	Bubbling cisticola	Cisticola bulliens	western Angola
	Hunter's cisticola	Cisticola hunteri	Kenya and northern Tanzania
	Chubb's cisticola	Cisticola chubbi	Western High Plateau and Albertine rift montane forests
	Kilombero cisticola	Cisticola bakerorum	Tanzania
	Black-lored cisticola	Cisticola nigriloris	Tanzania
	Rock-loving cisticola	Cisticola aberrans	Sub-Saharan Africa
-	Huambo cisticola	Cisticola bailunduensis	Angola
	Rattling cisticola	Cisticola chiniana	Sub-Saharan Africa (except western and southern Africa)
	Boran cisticola	Cisticola bodessa	Eritrea, Ethiopia and Kenya
	Churring cisticola	Cisticola njombe	Tanzania and northern Malawi
	Ashy cisticola	Cisticola cinereolus	East Africa
-	Tana River cisticola	Cisticola restrictus	Kenya
	Tinkling cisticola	Cisticola rufilatus	central-southern Africa
	Grey-backed cisticola	Cisticola subruficapilla	Namibia and South Africa
	Wailing cisticola	Cisticola lais	southern and eastern Afromontane
	Lynes's cisticola	Cisticola distinctus	Kenya
	Rufous-winged cisticola	Cisticola galactotes	southeastern Africa
	Winding cisticola	Cisticola marginatus	north/central Sub-Saharan Africa
	Coastal cisticola	Cisticola haematocephalus	coastal East Africa
	White-tailed cisticola	Cisticola anderseni	Tanzania
	Ethiopian cisticola	Cisticola lugubris	Ethiopia
	Luapula cisticola	Cisticola luapula	Zambia and adjacent areas
	Chirping cisticola	Cisticola pipiens	Zambia, Angola and southern DR Congo
	Carruthers's cisticola	Cisticola carruthersi	Rwenzori and northern Lake Victoria region
	Levaillant's cisticola	Cisticola tinniens	southern Sub-Saharan Africa
	Stout cisticola	Cisticola robustus	western and eastern Afromontane
	Aberdare cisticola	Cisticola aberdare	Kenya
	Croaking cisticola	Cisticola natalensis	Sub-Saharan Africa
	Red-pate cisticola	Cisticola ruficeps	Lake Chad to Eritrea and northern Uganda
	Dorst's cisticola	Cisticola guinea	western Africa
	Tiny cisticola	Cisticola nana	East Africa
	Short-winged cisticola	Cisticola brachypterus	Sub-Saharan Africa (except southern Africa)
	Rufous cisticola	Cisticola rufus	western Africa
	Foxy cisticola	Cisticola troglodytes	western CAR to Ethiopia
	Neddicky	Cisticola fulvicapilla	southern half of Sub-Saharan Africa
	Long-tailed cisticola	Cisticola angusticauda	Zambia and Tanzania
	Black-tailed cisticola	Cisticola melanurus	northern Angola and south-western DRC
	Zitting cisticola	Cisticola juncidis	Afrotropics, southern Palearctic and northern Australia
	Socotra cisticola	Cisticola haesitatus	Socotra
	Madagascar cisticola	Cisticola cherina	Seychelles and Madagascar
	Desert cisticola	Cisticola aridulus	Arid regions of Sub-Saharan Africa
	Cloud cisticola	Cisticola textrix	Angola, western Zambia and southern Africa
	Black-backed cisticola	Cisticola eximius	sparsely present across the Sudan (region), the Congo and western Kenya
	Dambo cisticola	Cisticola dambo	the Congo, southern DRC, northern Angola and Zambia
	Pectoral-patch cisticola	Cisticola brunnescens	Adamawa Massif, Gabon, the Congo and highlands of East Africa
	Pale-crowned cisticola	Cisticola cinnamomeus	the Congo, Tanzania to eastern South Africa
	Wing-snapping cisticola	Cisticola ayresii	highlands of southern Africa
	Golden-headed cisticola	Cisticola exilis	Indomalaya and western Oceania
