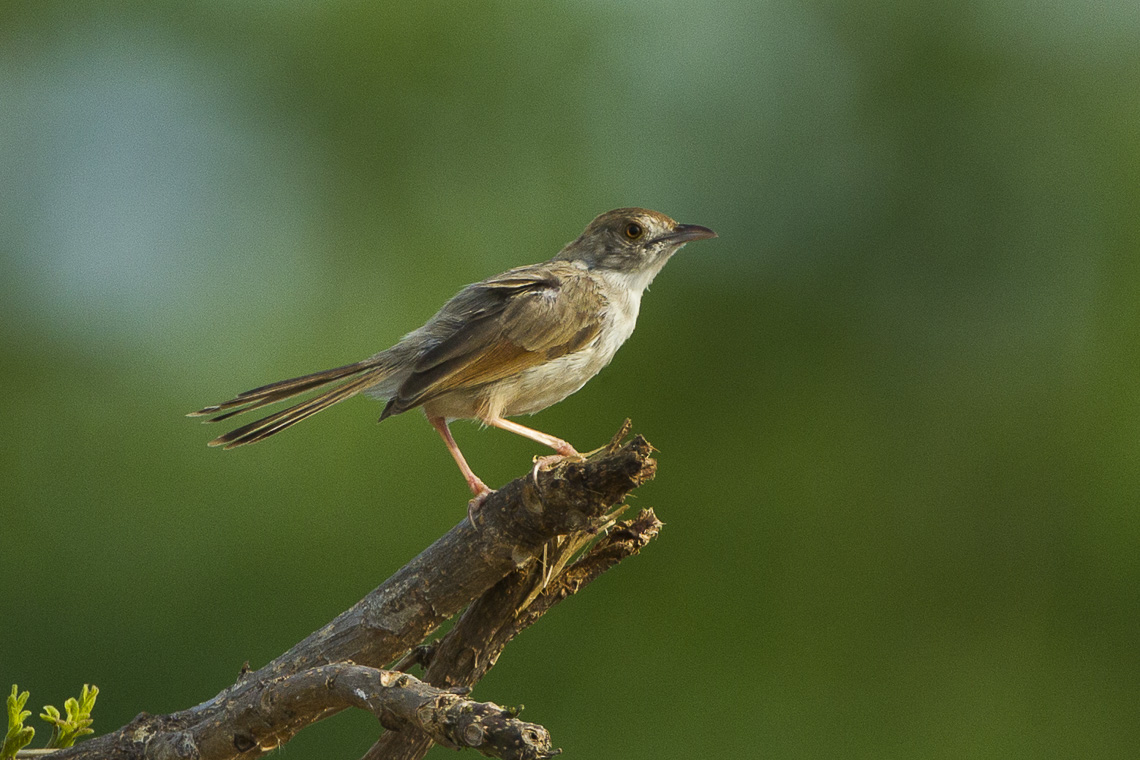

Conservation status
- Least Concern (IUCN 3.1)

Scientific classification
- Kingdom: Animalia
- Phylum: Chordata
- Class: Aves
- Order: Passeriformes
- Family: Cisticolidae
- Genus: Cisticola
- Species: C. njombe

Binomial name
- Cisticola njombe Lynes, 1933

= Churring cisticola =

Species of bird

The churring cisticola (Cisticola njombe) is a species of bird in the family Cisticolidae. It is found in Malawi, Tanzania, and Zambia. Its natural habitat is subtropical or tropical high-elevation grassland.
