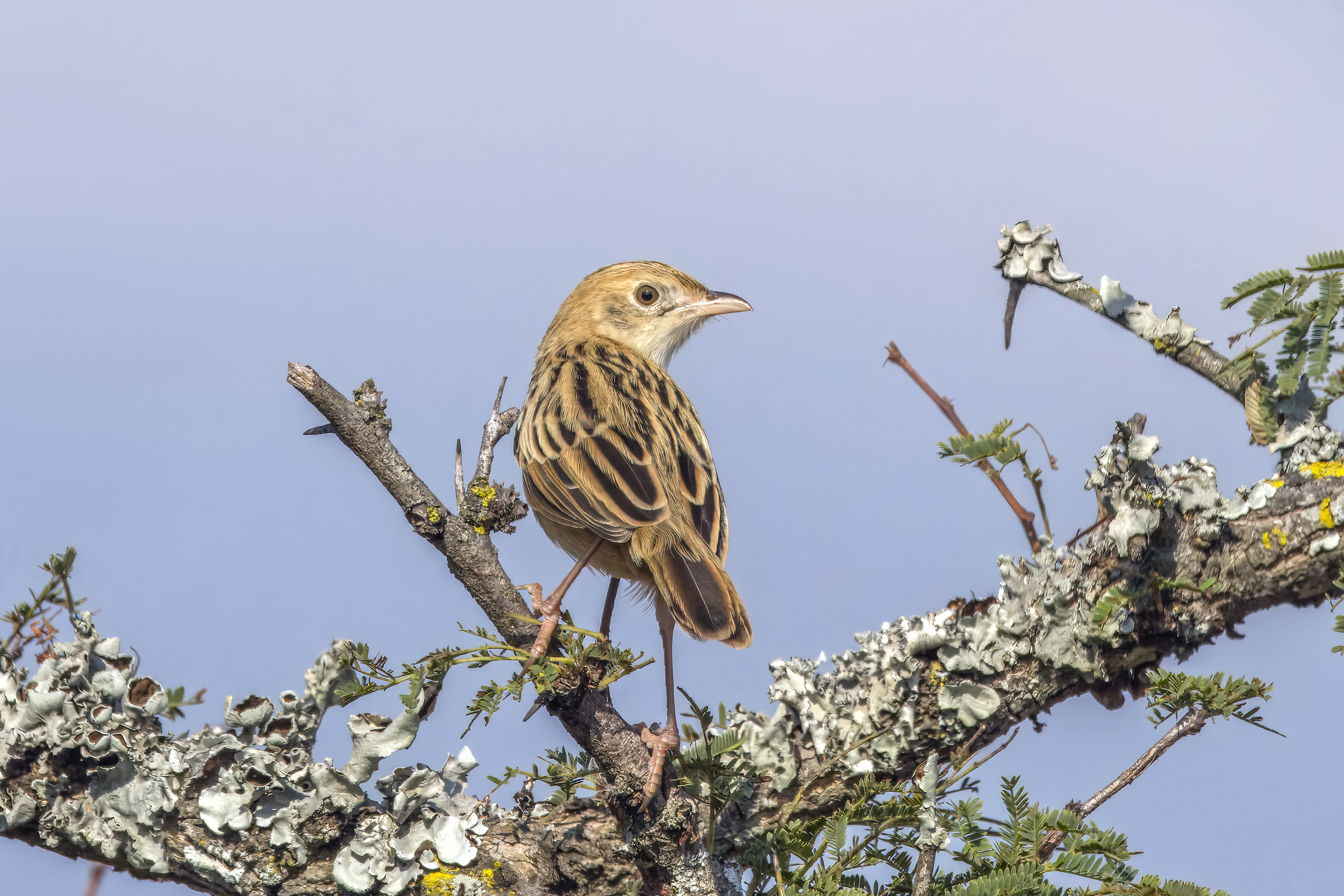
- C. n. strangei Serengeti National Park, Tanzania

Conservation status
- Least Concern (IUCN 3.1)

Scientific classification
- Kingdom: Animalia
- Phylum: Chordata
- Class: Aves
- Order: Passeriformes
- Family: Cisticolidae
- Genus: Cisticola
- Species: C. natalensis

Binomial name
- Cisticola natalensis (Smith, 1843)

= Croaking cisticola =

Species of bird

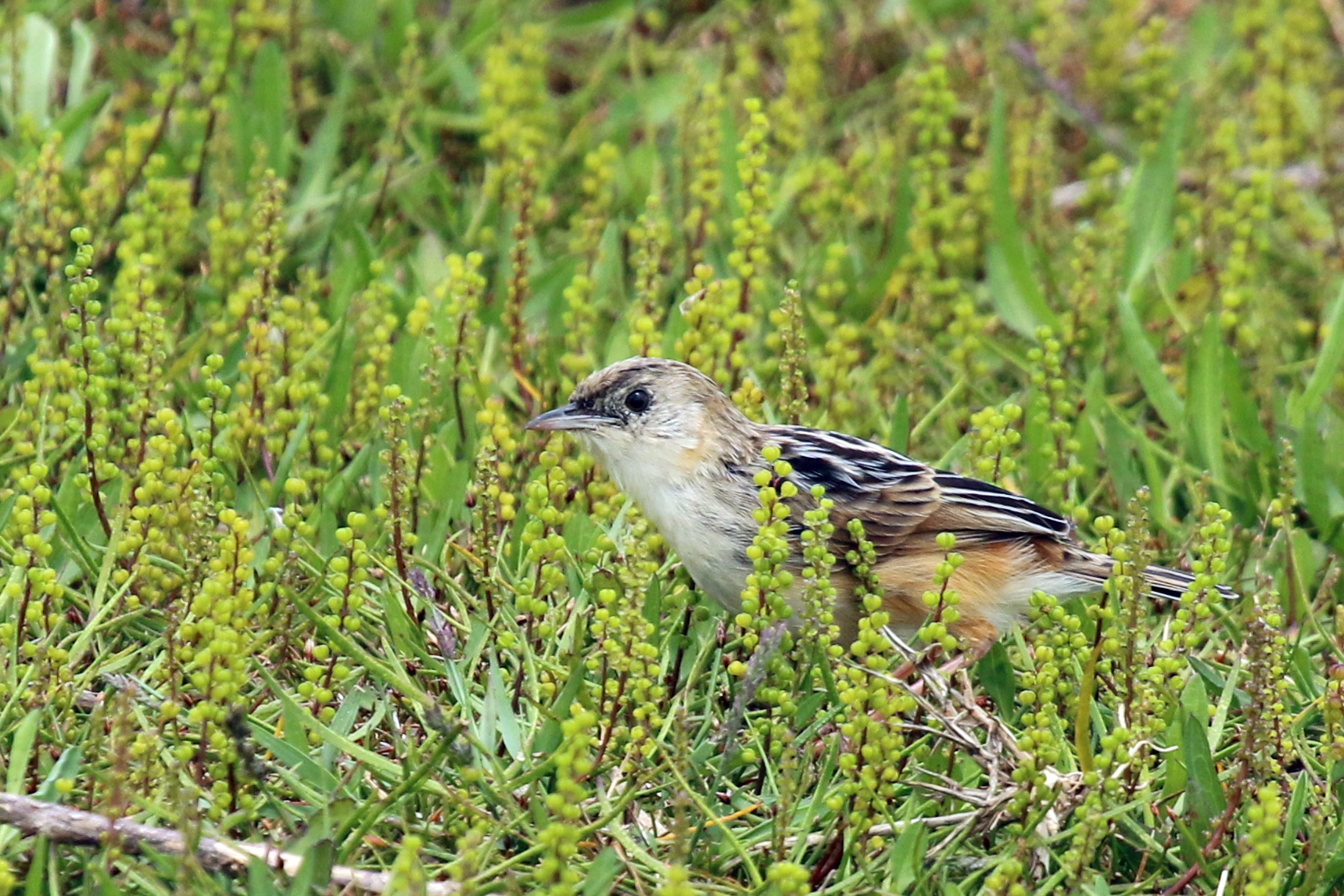
C. n. natalensis, Lake Sibaya, Kwa-Zulu Natal

The croaking cisticola (Cisticola natalensis) is an Old World warbler in the family Cisticolidae. It is a resident breeder in Africa south of the Sahara. The croaking cisticola is an insectivorous passerine that is found in rank grassland habitats, often near swamps or water. Male cisticolas are polygamous; the female builds a discreet nest deep in the grasses, often binding living leaves into the soft fabric of felted plant-down, cobwebs, and grass. The croaking cisticola's nest is a ball shape with a side entrance; 2-4 eggs are laid.

This is the largest cisticola. This warbler is grey-brown above, heavily streaked with black. The underparts are whitish, and the tail is broad, pale-tipped and flicked frequently. It has a chestnut wing-panel and a heavy bill. It is very similar to other members of its genus. It is best distinguished from its many African relatives by its size and froglike croaking breep-breep song. The song is always the easiest identification criterion for this genus. These birds are more easily heard than seen, and because of their small size (about 14 cm (5.5 in)) not always easy to recognise, particularly outside the breeding season when they seldom emerge from their grasses.
