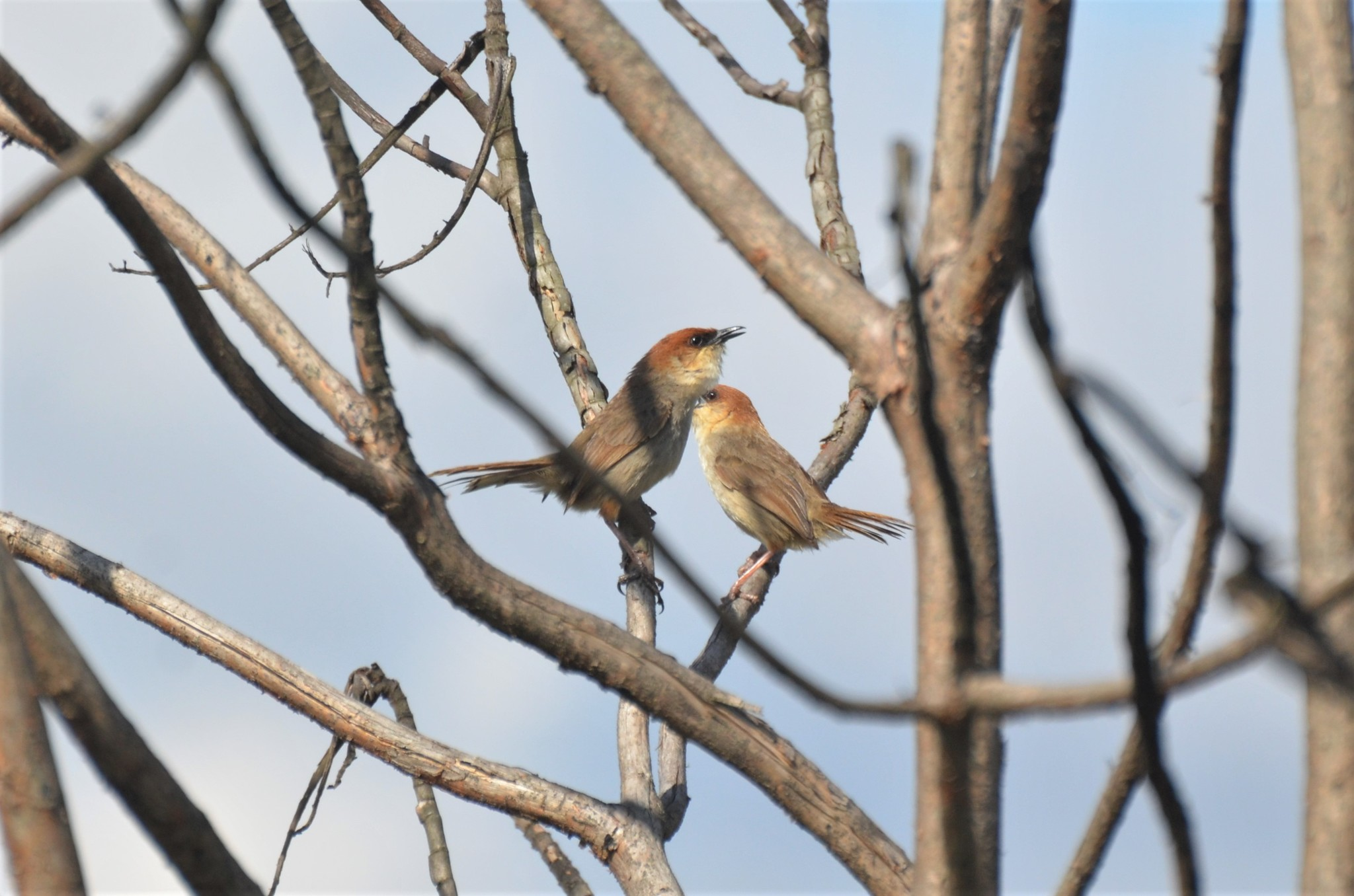

Conservation status
- Least Concern (IUCN 3.1)

Scientific classification
- Kingdom: Animalia
- Phylum: Chordata
- Class: Aves
- Order: Passeriformes
- Family: Cisticolidae
- Genus: Cisticola
- Species: C. nigriloris

Binomial name
- Cisticola nigriloris Shelley, 1897

= Black-lored cisticola =

Species of bird

The black-lored cisticola (Cisticola nigriloris) is a species of bird in the family Cisticolidae. It is found in Malawi, Tanzania, and Zambia. Its natural habitat is subtropical or tropical dry shrubland.
