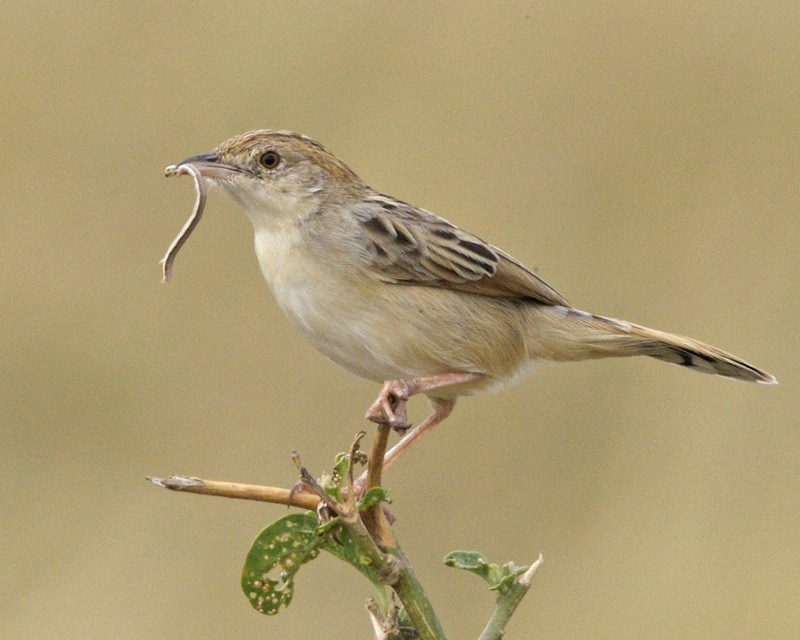

Conservation status
- Least Concern (IUCN 3.1)

Scientific classification
- Kingdom: Animalia
- Phylum: Chordata
- Class: Aves
- Order: Passeriformes
- Family: Cisticolidae
- Genus: Cisticola
- Species: C. aridulus

Binomial name
- Cisticola aridulus Witherby, 1900

= Desert cisticola =

Species of bird

The desert cisticola (Cisticola aridulus) is a species of bird in the family Cisticolidae. It is present throughout much of sub-Saharan Africa, although relatively absent from central and coastal western areas of the continent.

It is an insectivore. It forages primarily in grassy vegetation.
