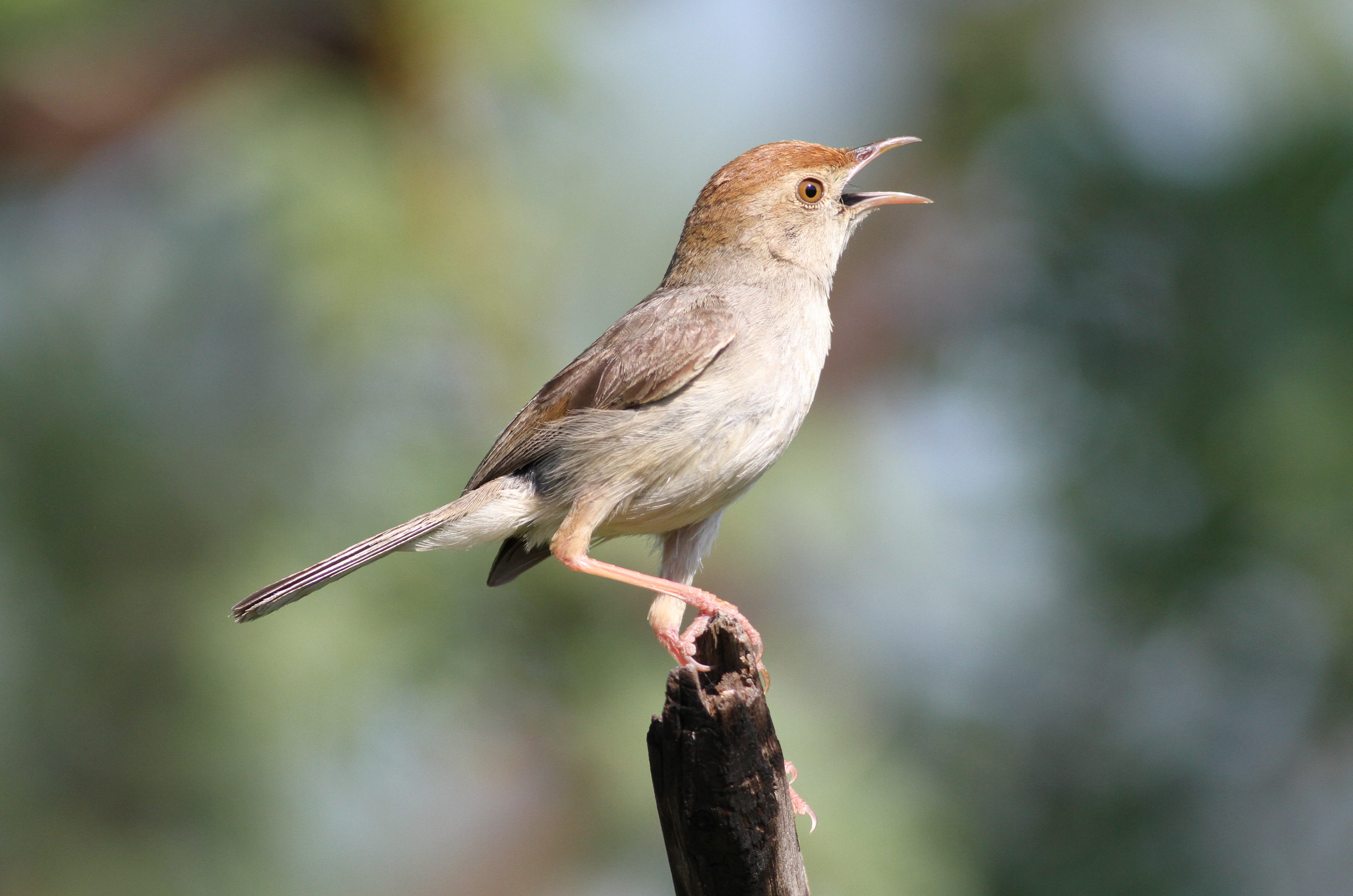
- Cisticola fulvicapilla dexter at Pilanesberg, South Africa

Conservation status
- Least Concern (IUCN 3.1)

Scientific classification
- Kingdom: Animalia
- Phylum: Chordata
- Class: Aves
- Order: Passeriformes
- Family: Cisticolidae
- Genus: Cisticola
- Species: C. fulvicapilla

Binomial name
- Cisticola fulvicapilla (Vieillot, 1817)

Synonyms
- Cisticola fulvicapillus

Audio
- Song recorded in Cape Province, South Africa

= Neddicky =

Species of bird

The neddicky, or piping cisticola (Cisticola fulvicapilla), is a small passerine bird in the family Cisticolidae, which is native to Africa, southwards of the equator. Its strongholds are the light woodlands and shrublands of the subtropics and temperate regions of southern Africa. The common name, neddicky, is the Afrikaans name for the species.

== Taxonomy ==
The neddicky was described by the French ornithologist Louis Pierre Vieillot in 1817 and given the binomial name Sylvia fulvicapilla. The specific epithet combines the Latin words fulvus "tawny" and -capillus "capped". The type locality is Graaff-Reinet in the Eastern Cape Province of South Africa. The species is now placed in the genus Cisticola which was erected by the German naturalist Johann Jakob Kaup in 1829.

Nine subspecies are recognised:

- Cisticola fulvicapilla dispar Sousa, 1887 – southeast Gabon to northwest Zambia and central Angola
- Cisticola fulvicapilla muelleri Alexander, 1899 – central Zambia to Mozambique and northeast Zimbabwe
- Cisticola fulvicapilla hallae Benson, 1955 – south Angola and northeast Namibia to west Zimbabwe
- Cisticola fulvicapilla dexter Clancey, 1971 – southeast Botswana to central Zimbabwe and inland northeast South Africa
- Cisticola fulvicapilla ruficapilla (Smith, A., 1842) – central South Africa
- Cisticola fulvicapilla lebombo (Roberts, 1936) – south Mozambique and coastal northeast South Africa
- Cisticola fulvicapilla fulvicapilla (Vieillot, 1817) – inland east South Africa
- Cisticola fulvicapilla dumicola Clancey, 1983 – coastal east South Africa
- Cisticola fulvicapilla silberbauer (Roberts, 1919) – southwest South Africa

== Description ==
The neddicky is a small, vocal, dull-coloured brown bird, 11 cm in length. Its tail is not as short as that of some other cisticola species. This bird has a reddish cap and a plain back. The underparts are buff, darker in tone on the breast. The brown bill is short and straight, and the feet and legs are pinkish-brown. The eye is light brown. The sexes are similar, but juvenile birds are yellower. The southern form, found in the southern parts of South Africa, has the face and underpart plumage grey, with the back plumage greyish brown. As opposed to most cisticolas which are very similarly plumaged, this trio of greyish plumaged subspecies stands out as quite distinctive.

The call of the neddicky is a monotonous, penetrating, repetitive weep weep weep. The alarm call is a loud clicking tictictictic, like a fingernail running across the teeth of a comb.

== Distribution and habitat ==
The neddicky is a resident breeder in much of Africa from Gabon, the DRC, Rwanda and Tanzania south to the Cape. It is a common bird of open woodland, including savannah with trees and open plantations of exotic species. It avoids densely wooded habitats.

== Behaviour ==
The neddicky is usually seen in pairs or singly, flitting in a bush or the grass at the base of a tree as it forages for small insects.

=== Breeding ===
The neddicky builds a ball-shaped nest with a side entrance from dry grass, cobwebs and felted plant down. The nest is placed low in a thorny shrub, or in thick grass. In South Africa, this bird breeds mainly from September to March.

== Conservation status ==
This common species has a large range, with an estimated extent of 4,100,000 km^{2}. The population size is believed to be large, and the species is not believed to approach the thresholds for the population decline criterion of the IUCN Red List (i.e. declining more than 30% in ten years or three generations). For these reasons, the species is evaluated as least concern.

== Gallery ==
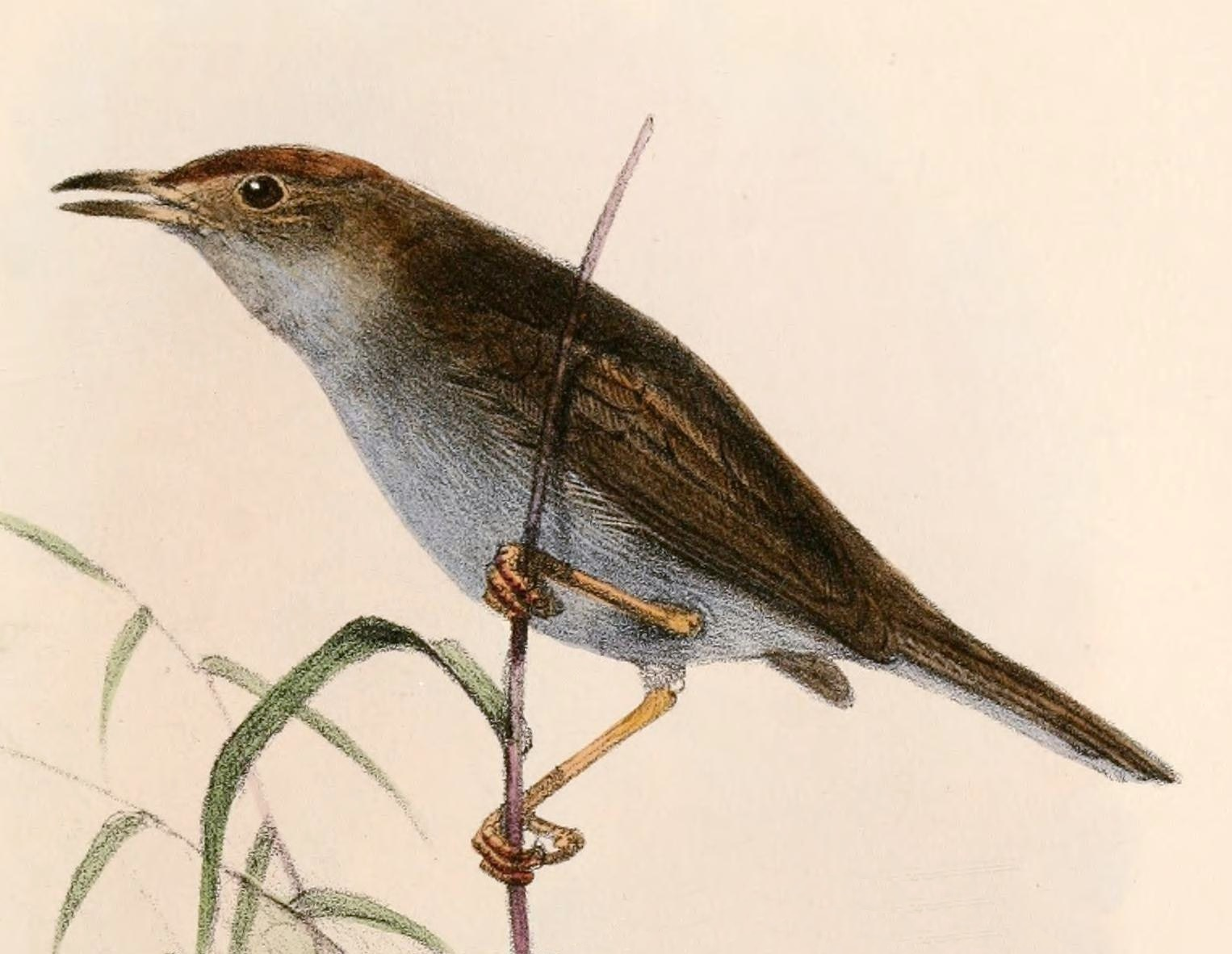
The South African coastal subspp., i.e. C. f. fulvicapilla, C. f. dumicola and C. f. silberbauer, have their underpart plumages uniformly grey

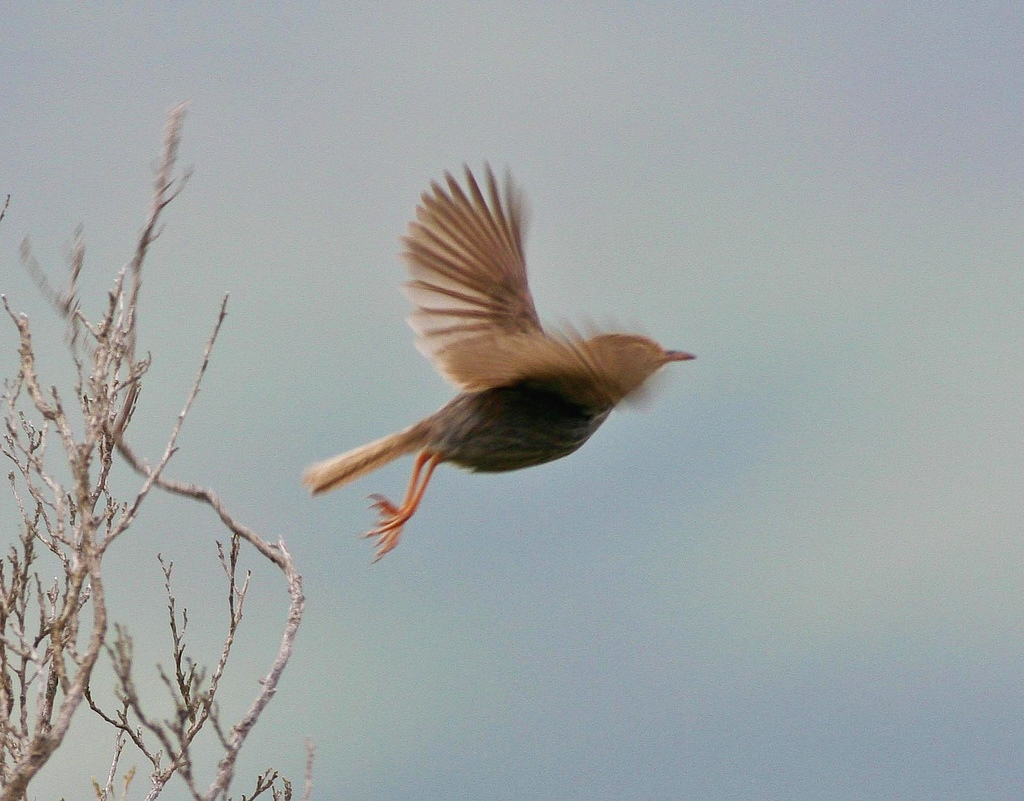
In flight at Outeniqua pass, South Africa
