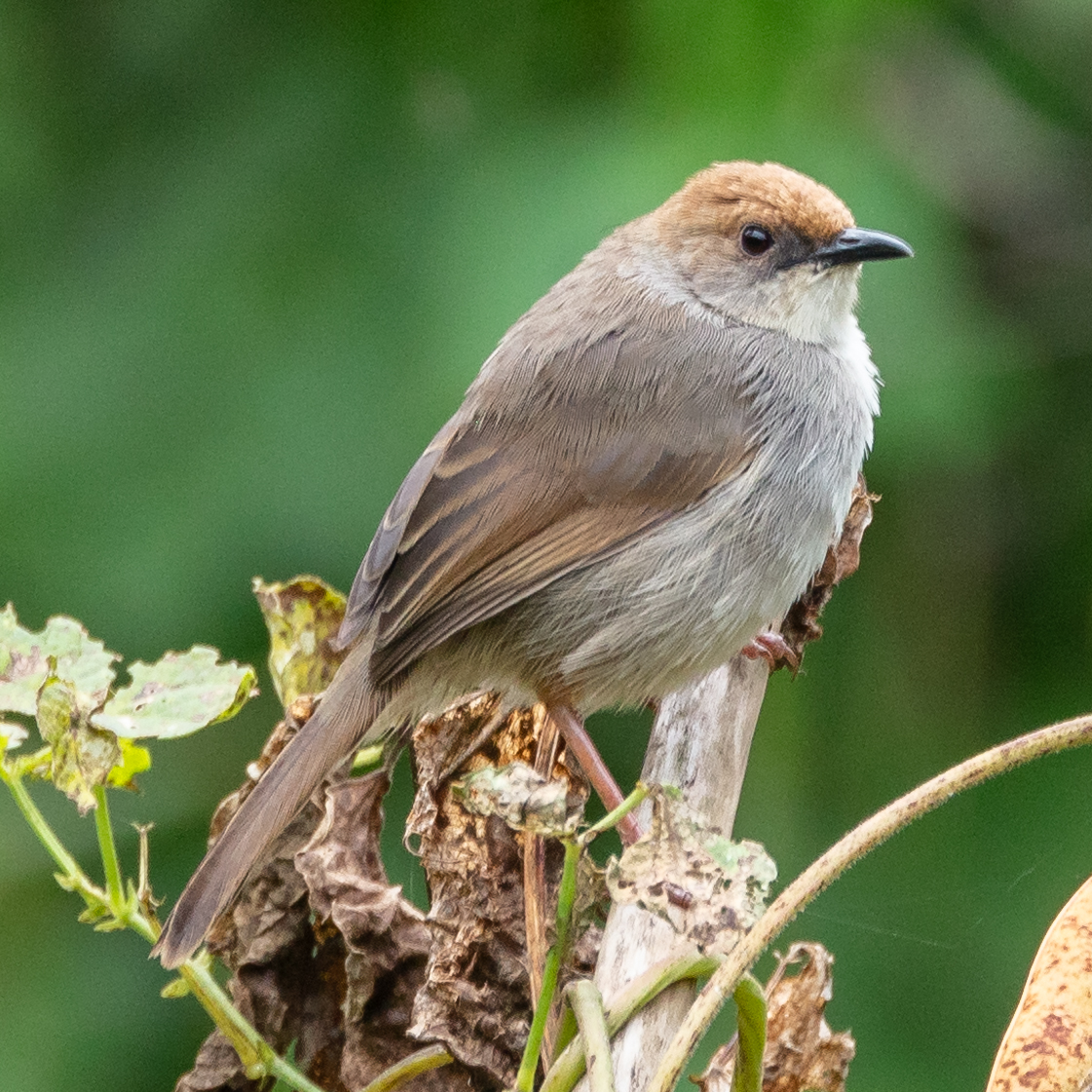

Conservation status
- Least Concern (IUCN 3.1)

Scientific classification
- Kingdom: Animalia
- Phylum: Chordata
- Class: Aves
- Order: Passeriformes
- Family: Cisticolidae
- Genus: Cisticola
- Species: C. cantans

Binomial name
- Cisticola cantans (Heuglin, 1869)

= Singing cisticola =

Species of bird

The singing cisticola (Cisticola cantans) is a species of bird in the family Cisticolidae. It is native to northern and eastern sub-Saharan Africa.

Its natural habitats are subtropical or tropical dry forest and subtropical or tropical dry shrubland.

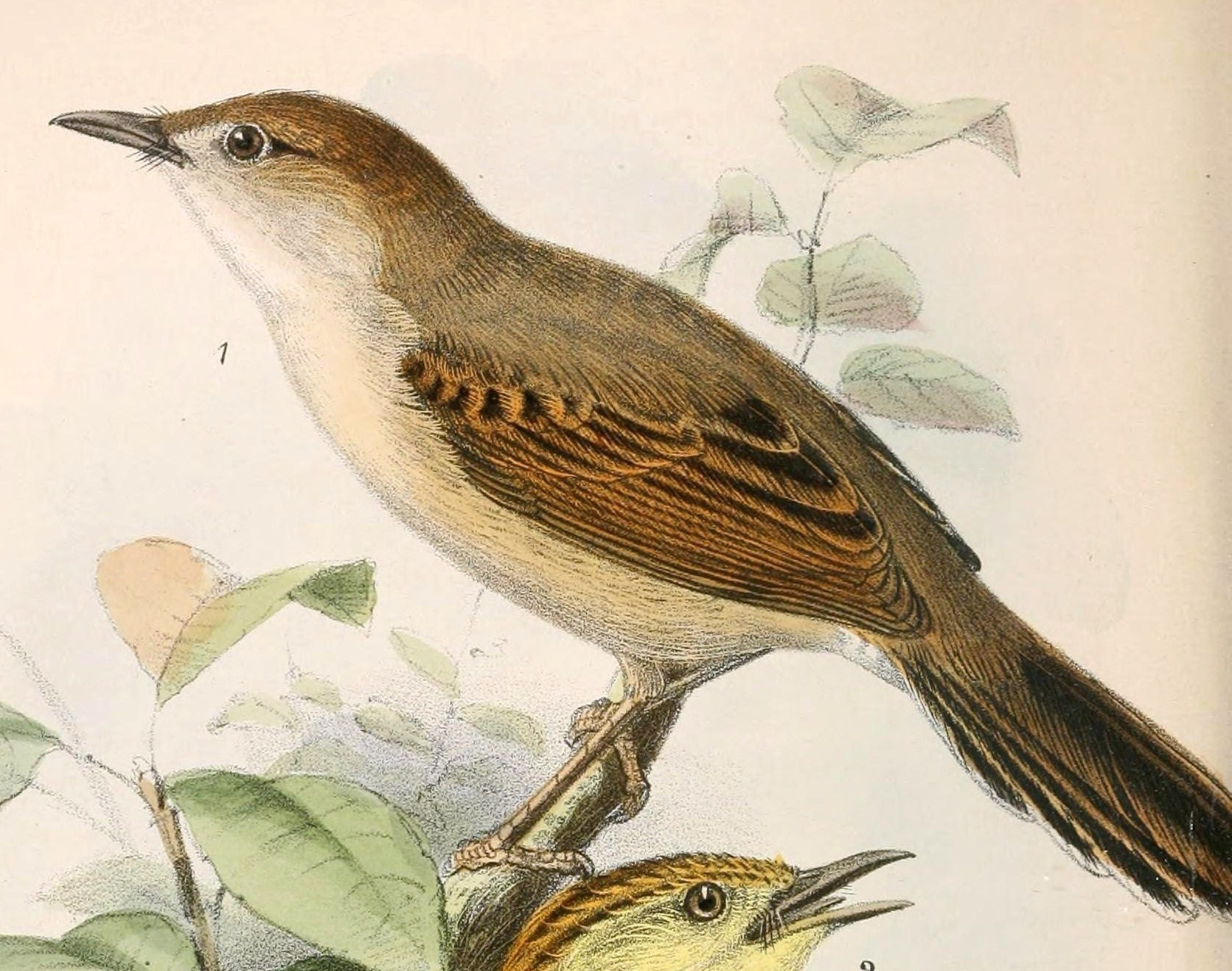
Illustration
