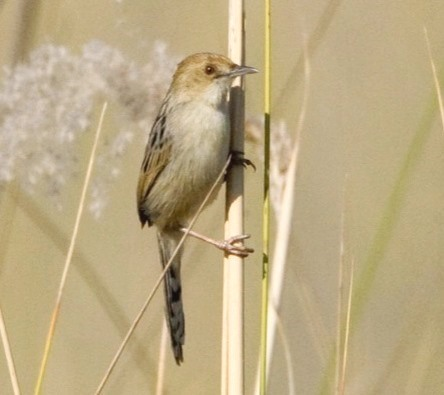
- C. p. arundicola at Moremi, Botswana

Conservation status
- Least Concern (IUCN 3.1)

Scientific classification
- Kingdom: Animalia
- Phylum: Chordata
- Class: Aves
- Order: Passeriformes
- Family: Cisticolidae
- Genus: Cisticola
- Species: C. pipiens

Binomial name
- Cisticola pipiens Lynes, 1930

= Chirping cisticola =

Species of bird

The chirping cisticola (Cisticola pipiens) is a species of bird in the family Cisticolidae. It is found in Angola, Botswana, Burundi, Democratic Republic of the Congo, Namibia, Tanzania, Zambia, and Zimbabwe. Its natural habitats are subtropical or tropical seasonally wet or flooded lowland grassland and swamps.

== Gallery ==
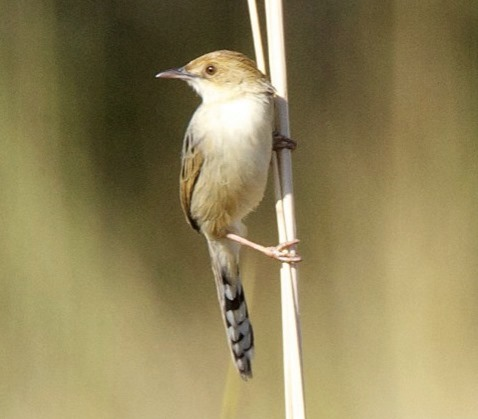
at Moremi, Botswana

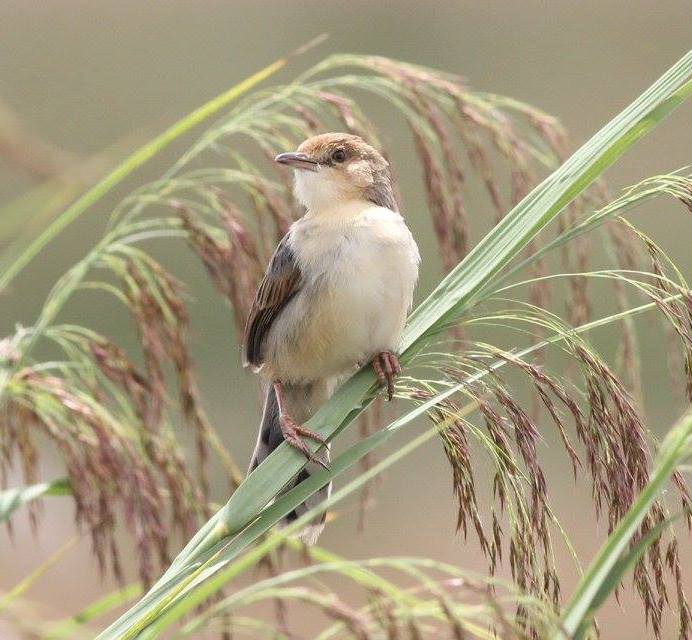
at Kateque, Angola
