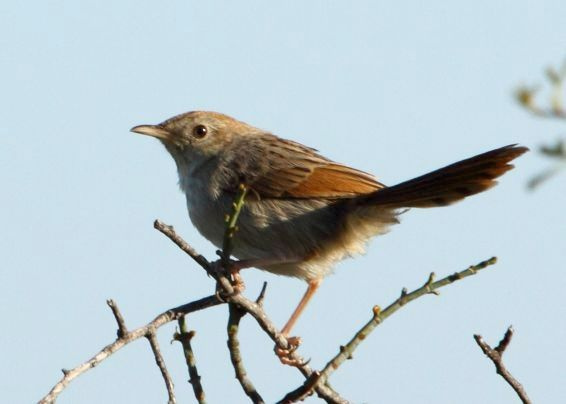
- At Namaqua National Park, Northern Cape, South Africa

Conservation status
- Least Concern (IUCN 3.1)

Scientific classification
- Kingdom: Animalia
- Phylum: Chordata
- Class: Aves
- Order: Passeriformes
- Family: Cisticolidae
- Genus: Cisticola
- Species: C. subruficapilla

Binomial name
- Cisticola subruficapilla (Smith, 1843)

Synonyms
- Cisticola subruficapillus

= Grey-backed cisticola =

Species of bird

The grey-backed cisticola or red-headed cisticola (Cisticola subruficapilla) is a small passerine bird. This cisticola is a resident breeder in southernmost Angola, Namibia and western South Africa.

The grey-backed cisticola is a very common bird of coastal fynbos, karoo shrub and grassy areas on estuarine flats.

== Description ==
The grey-backed cisticola is a small, 13–14 cm long, vocal, dull-coloured bird with a dark rufous crown to its reddish head. It has a rufous panel in the folded wing. The grey bill is short and straight, and the feet and legs are pinkish-brown. The eye is light brown.

The southern form, "grey-backed cisticola" proper, found in southern Namibia and South Africa has a grey back heavily streaked with black. Its underparts are greyish white. Although cisticolas can be very similar in plumage, this greyish subspecies is quite distinctive. The northern subspecies has a brown back heavily streaked with black and cold buff underparts. It is very similar to the wailing cisticola, Cisticola lais, of eastern South Africa, but that species has warmer buff underparts and does not overlap in range.

The sexes are similar, but juvenile birds are duller with a yellow face.

The call of the grey-backed cisticola is a soft prrrrt followed by a sharp wheee phweee.

== Behaviour ==
The grey-backed cisticola builds a ball-shaped nest with a side entrance from dry grass, cobwebs and felted plant down.

It is usually seen in pairs or singly, flitting in a bush or the grass at the base of a tree as it forages for small insects.

== Conservation status ==
This common species has a large range, with an estimated extent of 820,000 km². The population size is believed to be large, and the species is not believed to approach the thresholds for the population decline criterion of the IUCN Red List (i.e. declining more than 30% in ten years or three generations). For these reasons, the species is evaluated as least concern.
