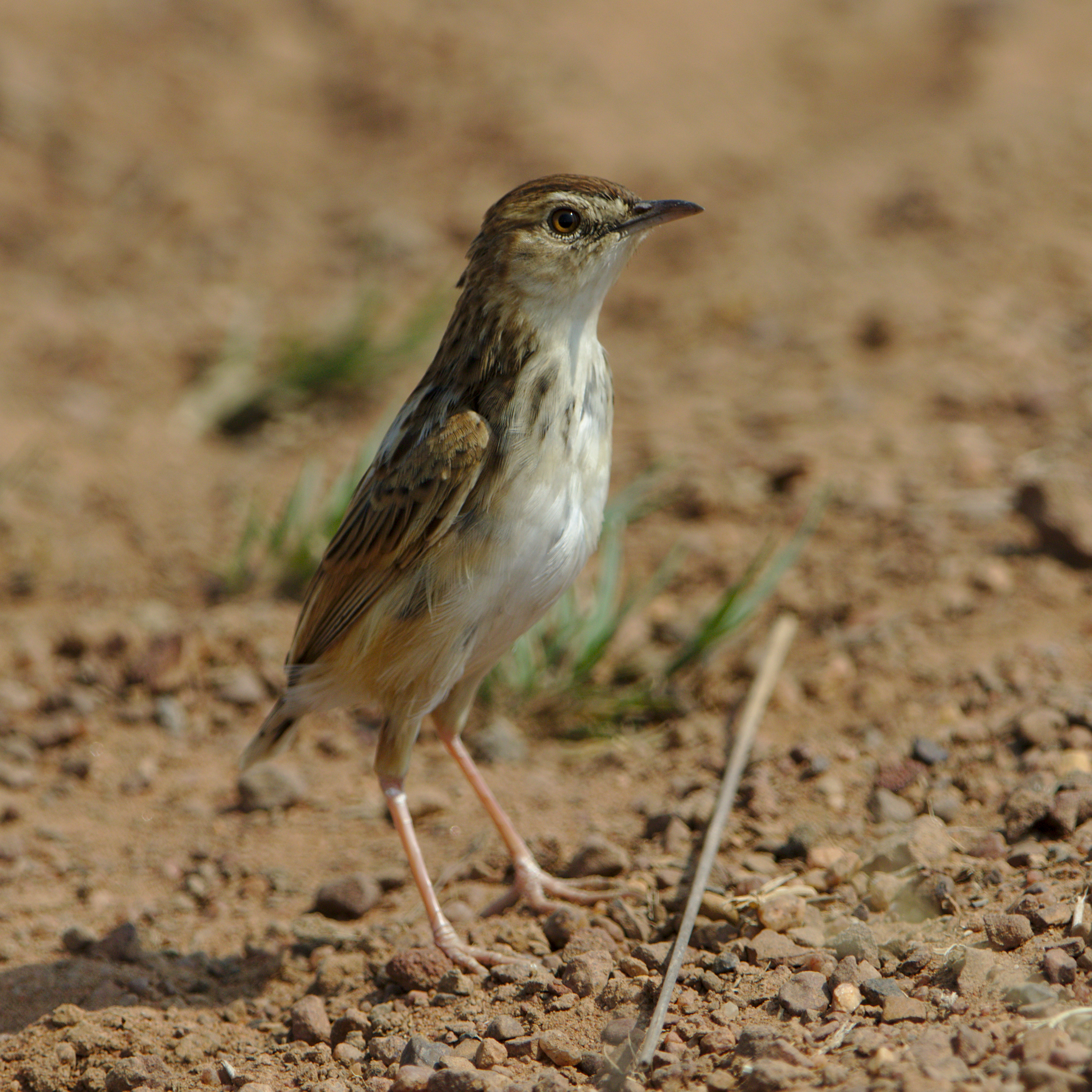
- Adult at Ezemvelo Nature Reserve, near Bronkhorstspruit, South Africa
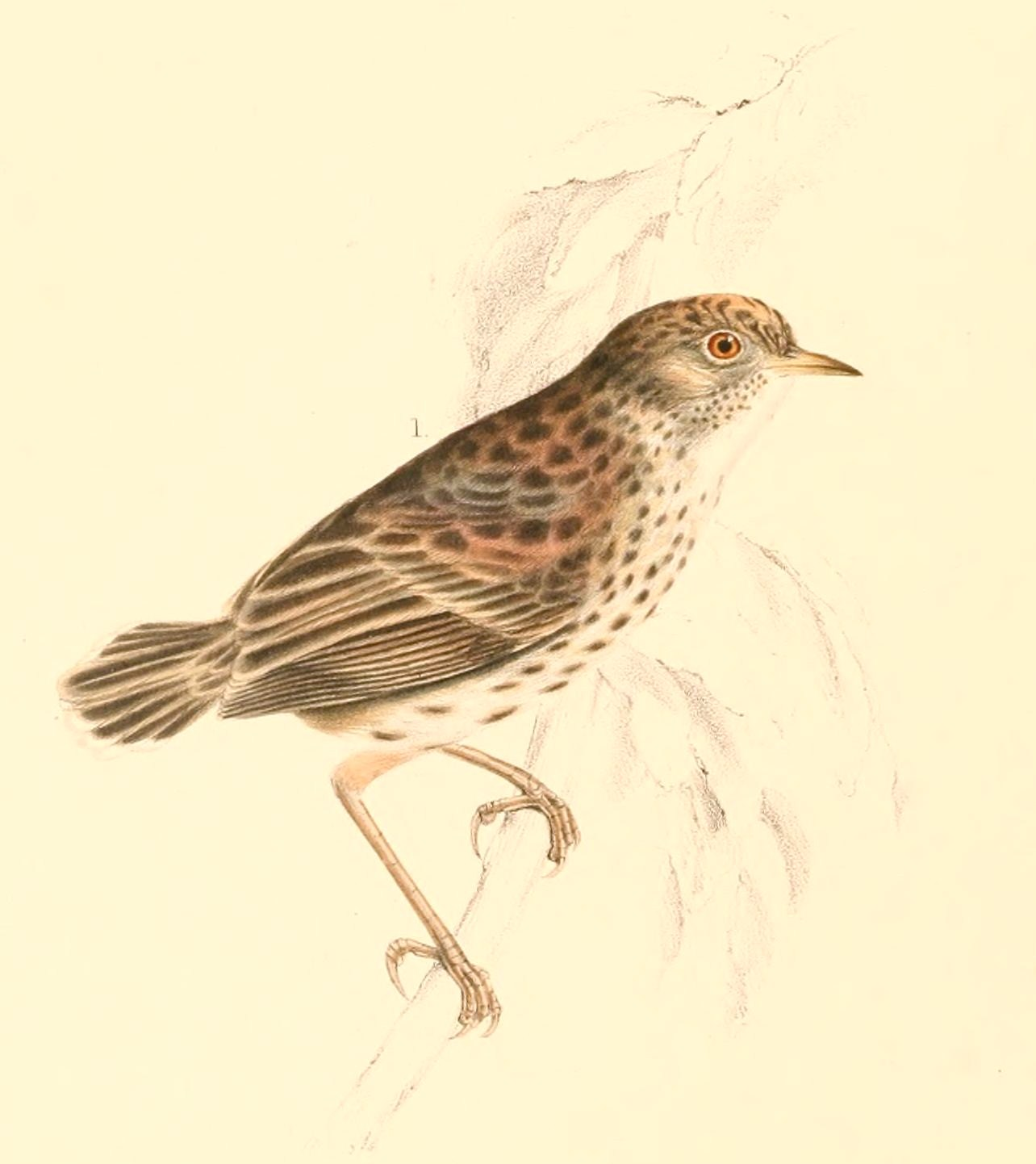

Conservation status
- Least Concern (IUCN 3.1)

Scientific classification
- Kingdom: Animalia
- Phylum: Chordata
- Class: Aves
- Order: Passeriformes
- Family: Cisticolidae
- Genus: Cisticola
- Species: C. textrix

Binomial name
- Cisticola textrix (Vieillot, 1817)

Audio
- Calls (Western Cape, South Africa)

= Cloud cisticola =

Species of bird

The cloud cisticola or tink-tink cisticola (Cisticola textrix) is a species of bird in the family Cisticolidae. It is found in Angola, Eswatini, Lesotho, Mozambique, South Africa, and Zambia, and its natural habitat is subtropical or tropical dry lowland grassland.

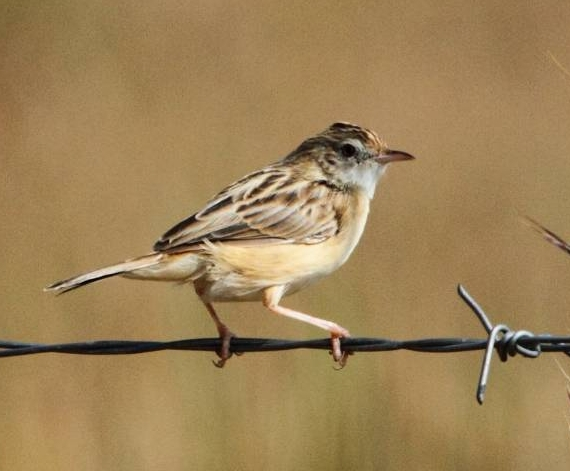
Cloud cisticola in KwaZulu-Natal
