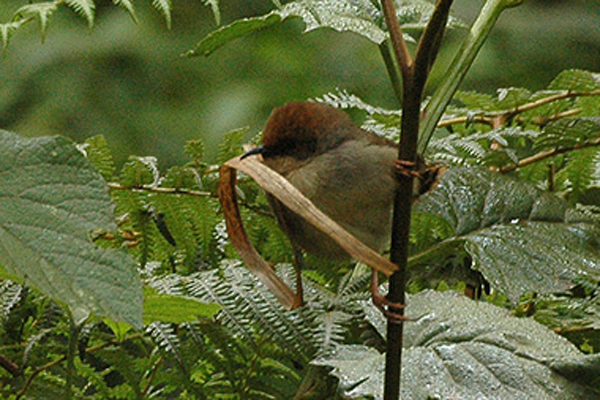

Conservation status
- Least Concern (IUCN 3.1)

Scientific classification
- Kingdom: Animalia
- Phylum: Chordata
- Class: Aves
- Order: Passeriformes
- Family: Cisticolidae
- Genus: Cisticola
- Species: C. chubbi

Binomial name
- Cisticola chubbi Sharpe, 1892

= Chubb's cisticola =

Species of bird

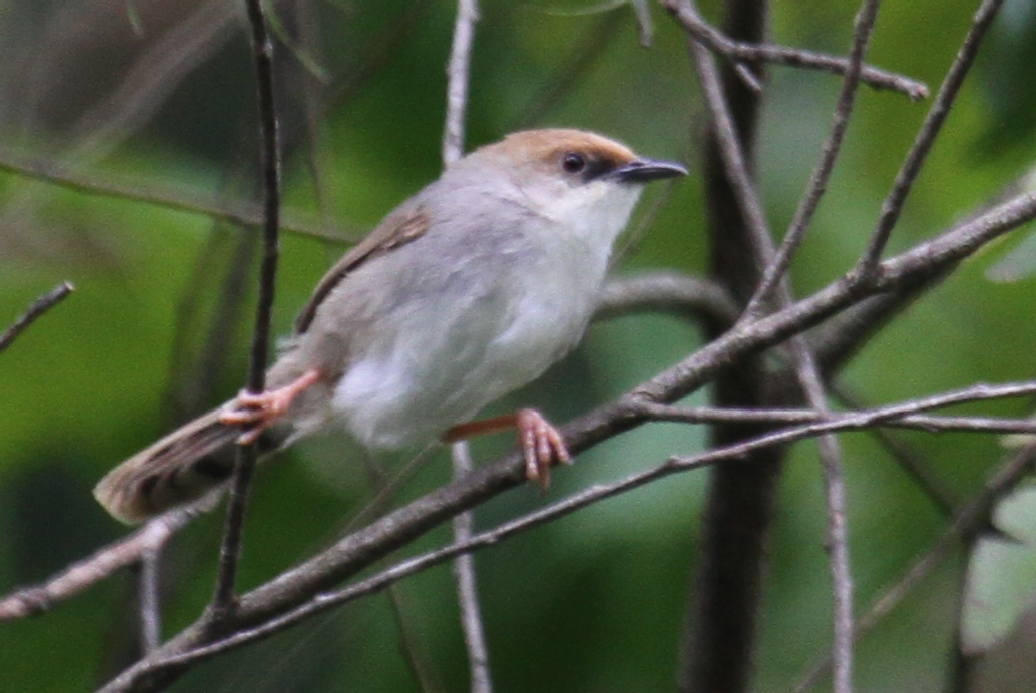
Kakamega Forest - Kenya

Chubb's cisticola (Cisticola chubbi) is a species of bird in the family Cisticolidae. It is native to the Western High Plateau, the Albertine Rift montane forests and the East African montane forests.

There are four subspecies:

- C. c. adametzi Reichenow, 1910 – southeastern Nigeria and southwestern Cameroon
- C. c. discolor Sjöstedt, 1893 – Mount Cameroon (southwest Cameroon) – brown-backed cisticola
- C. c. chubbi Sharpe, 1892 – eastern DR Congo to western Kenya
- C. c. marungensis Chapin, 1932 – Marungu highlands (southeastern DR Congo)

It is territorial. It spends most of its time in dense vegetation.

== Vocalization ==
In duets, males trill and females whistle. Females produce longer and lower-pitched notes. Chubb's cisticolas also sometimes sing in choruses of up to five; this is most common at the end of breeding season. Solo singing is very rare.

Duets and choruses are likely primarily for the purpose of territorial defense. They are always done while in sight of the other participating bird(s)—less than 1 meter apart. They perform dance-like movements such as moving their tails and flapping their wings to make snapping noises.

They sing from elevated places.

== Mating and Breeding ==
They are most likely monogamous.

Nests are primarily built by females, and are placed 0.5-2m above the ground.

Females take the main role in incubating eggs.
