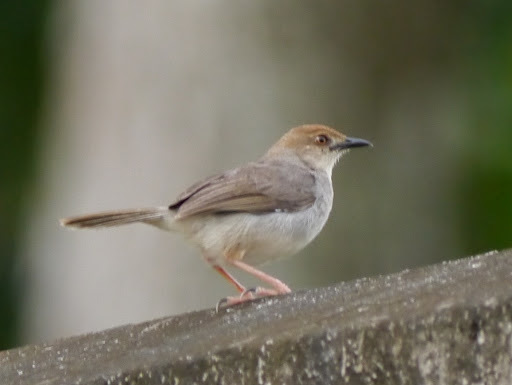

Conservation status
- Least Concern (IUCN 3.1)

Scientific classification
- Kingdom: Animalia
- Phylum: Chordata
- Class: Aves
- Order: Passeriformes
- Family: Cisticolidae
- Genus: Cisticola
- Species: C. anonymus

Binomial name
- Cisticola anonymus (von Müller, 1855)

= Chattering cisticola =

Species of bird

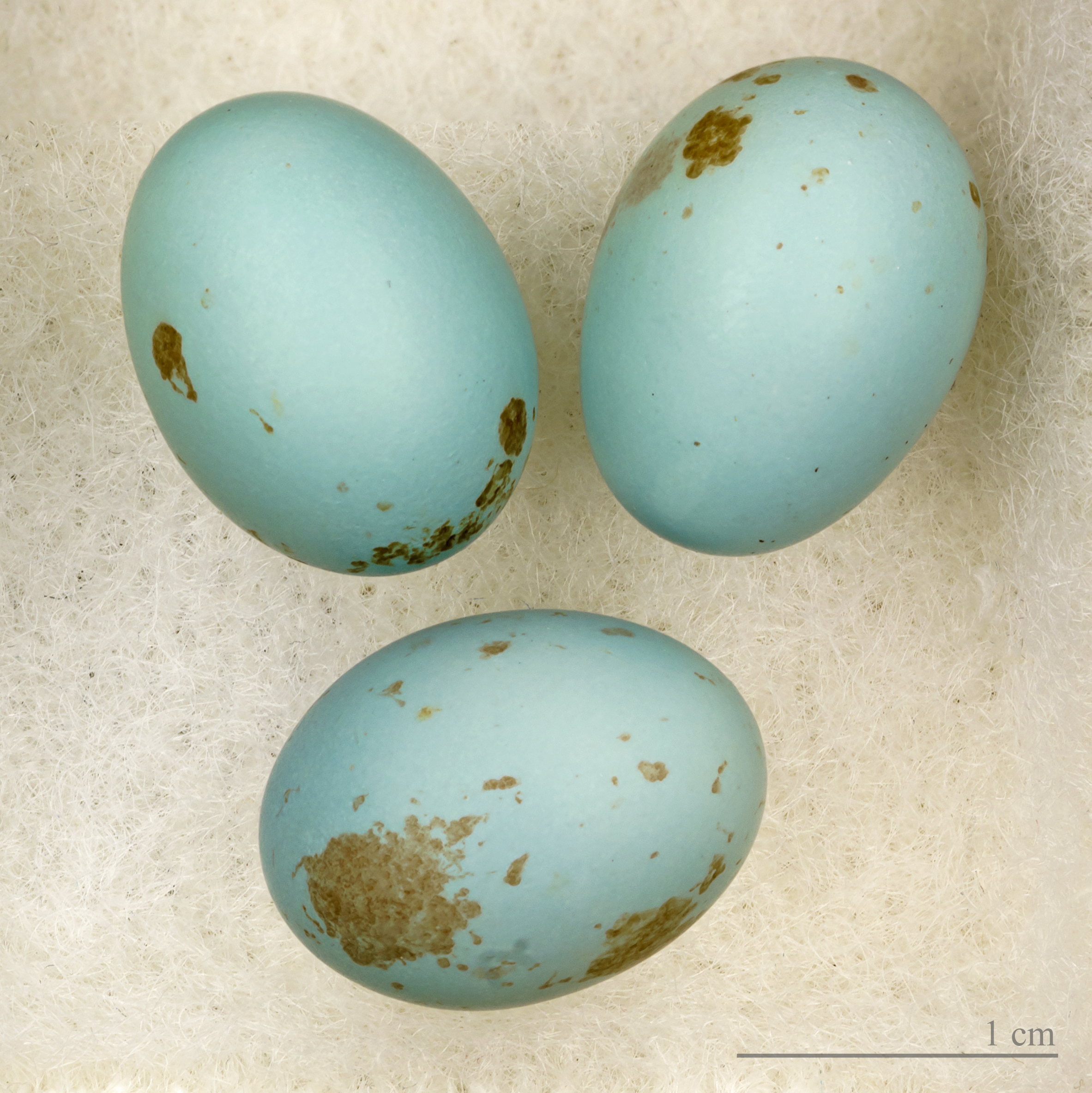
Cisticola anonymus - MHNT

The chattering cisticola (Cisticola anonymus) is a species of bird in the family Cisticolidae. It is native to the African tropical rainforest. Its natural habitats are dry savanna and swamps.
