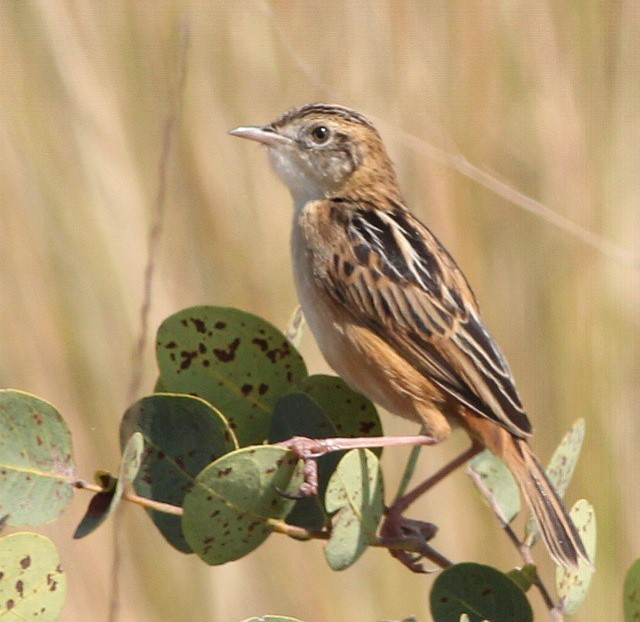
- At Longa, Angola

Conservation status
- Least Concern (IUCN 3.1)

Scientific classification
- Kingdom: Animalia
- Phylum: Chordata
- Class: Aves
- Order: Passeriformes
- Family: Cisticolidae
- Genus: Cisticola
- Species: C. dambo

Binomial name
- Cisticola dambo Lynes, 1931

= Dambo cisticola =

Species of bird

The dambo cisticola or cloud-scraping cisticola (Cisticola dambo) is a species of bird in the family Cisticolidae. It is found in Angola, the DRC and Zambia. Its natural habitat is subtropical or tropical seasonally wet or flooded lowland grassland.
