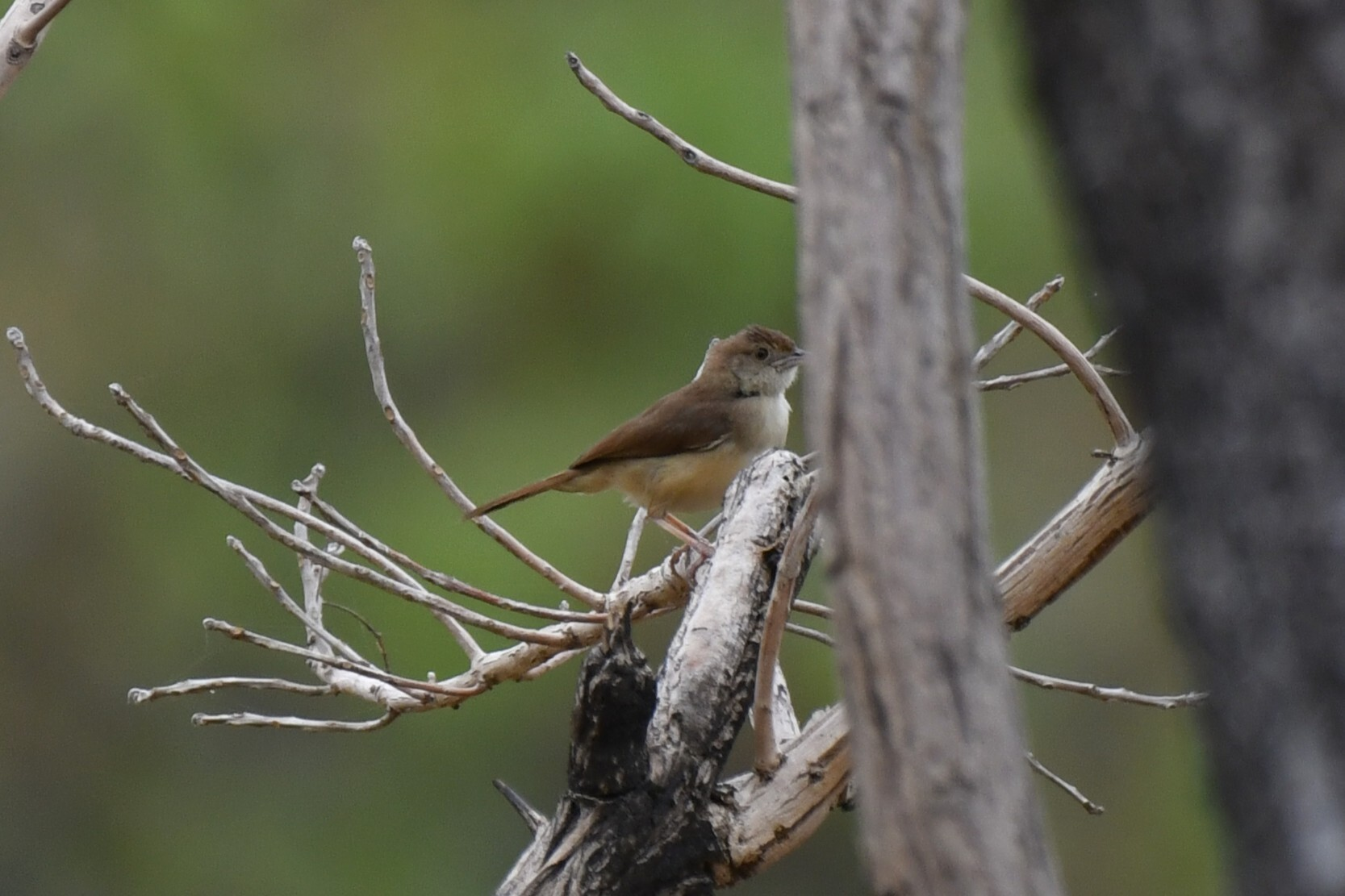

Conservation status
- Least Concern (IUCN 3.1)

Scientific classification
- Kingdom: Animalia
- Phylum: Chordata
- Class: Aves
- Order: Passeriformes
- Family: Cisticolidae
- Genus: Cisticola
- Species: C. rufus

Binomial name
- Cisticola rufus (Fraser, 1843)

= Rufous cisticola =

Species of bird

The rufous cisticola (Cisticola rufus) is a species of bird in the family Cisticolidae. It is found in Burkina Faso, Cameroon, Central African Republic, Chad, Gambia, Ghana, Guinea, Mali, Nigeria, Senegal, Sierra Leone, and Togo. Its natural habitats are subtropical or tropical dry shrubland and subtropical or tropical dry lowland grassland.
