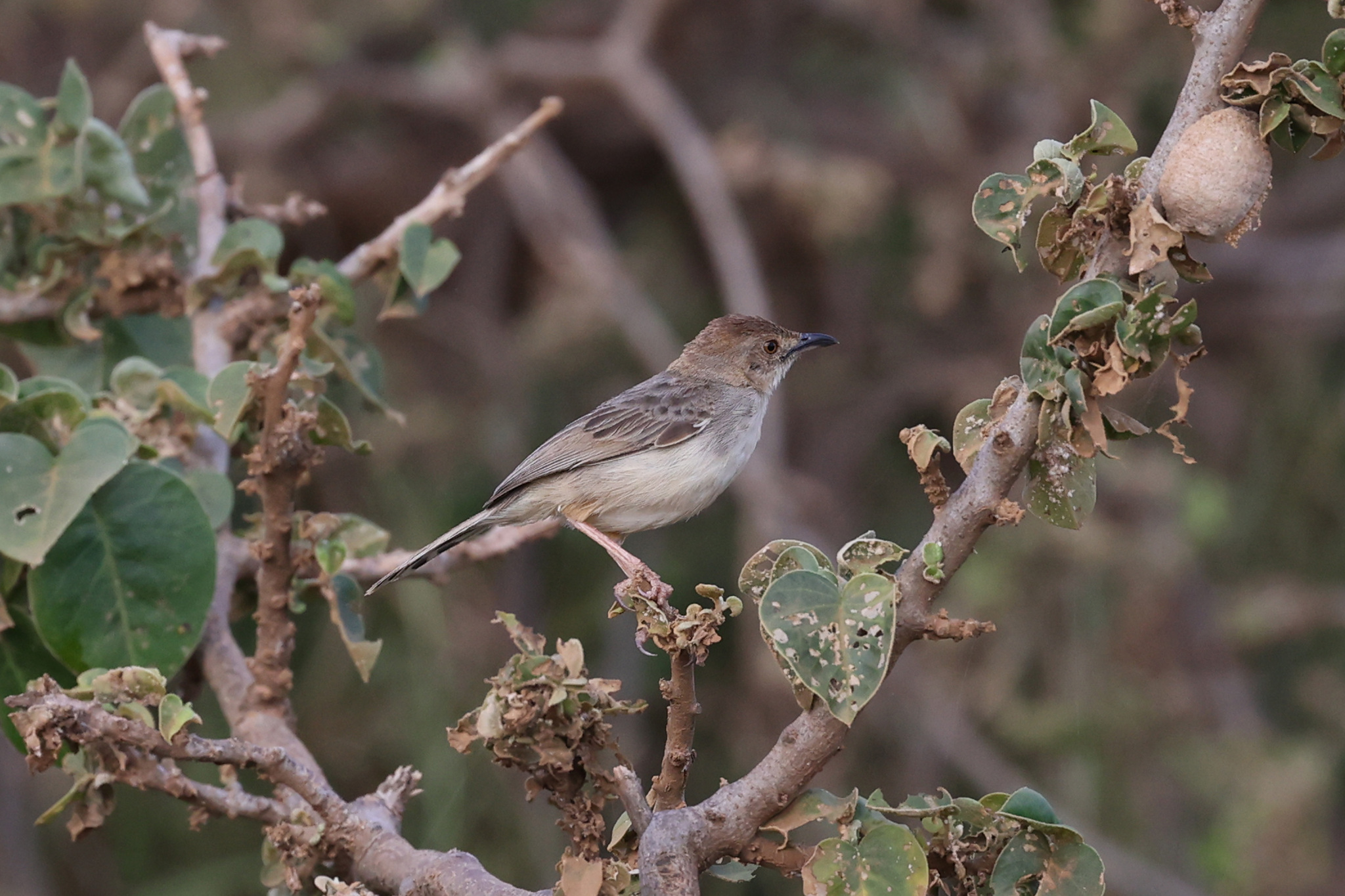

Conservation status
- Least Concern (IUCN 3.1)

Scientific classification
- Kingdom: Animalia
- Phylum: Chordata
- Class: Aves
- Order: Passeriformes
- Family: Cisticolidae
- Genus: Cisticola
- Species: C. bodessa

Binomial name
- Cisticola bodessa Mearns, 1913

= Boran cisticola =

Species of bird

The Boran cisticola (Cisticola bodessa) is a species of bird in the family Cisticolidae. It is found in Ethiopia, Kenya and Uganda. Its natural habitats are subtropical or tropical dry forest, dry savanna, and subtropical or tropical dry shrubland.
