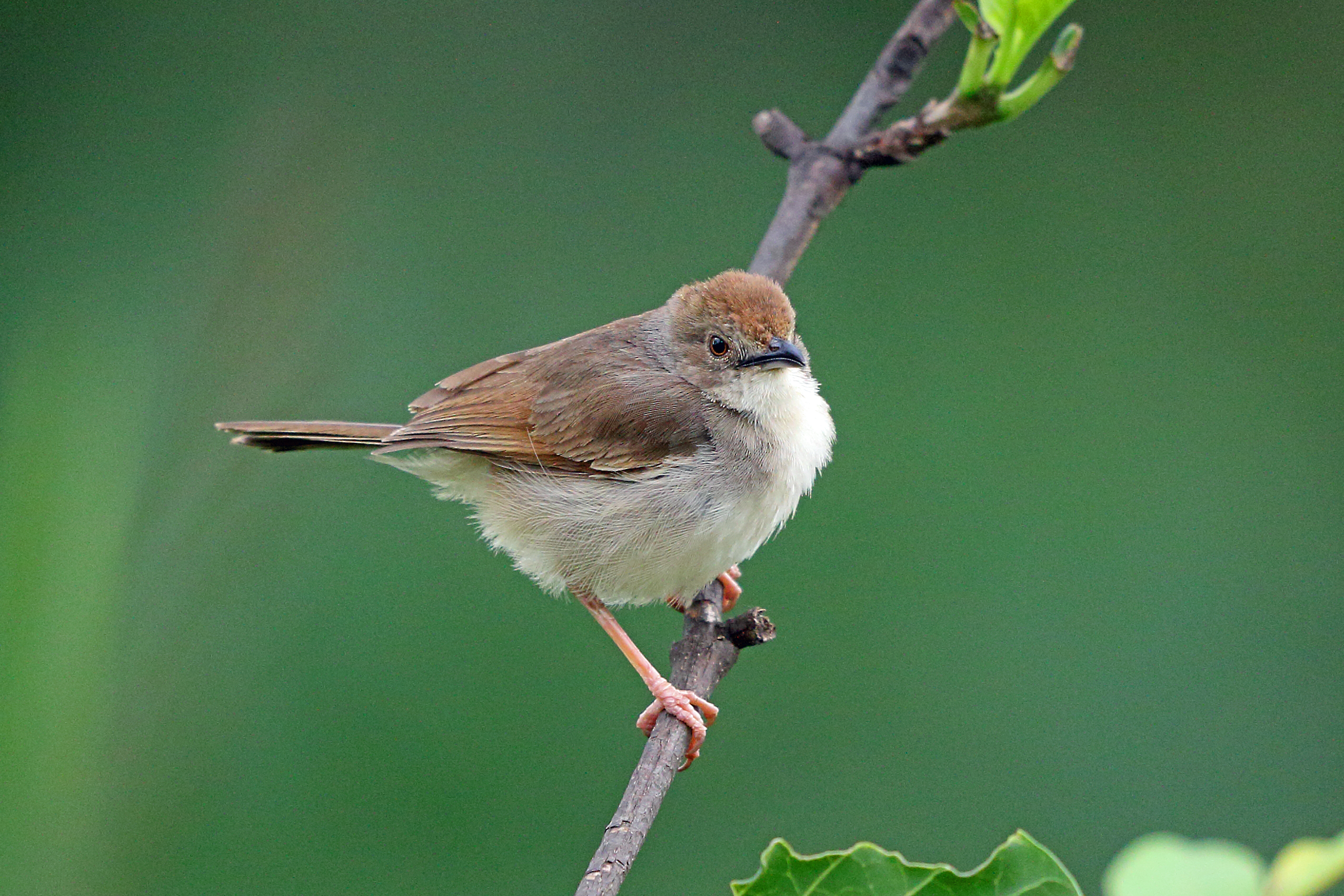

Conservation status
- Least Concern (IUCN 3.1)

Scientific classification
- Kingdom: Animalia
- Phylum: Chordata
- Class: Aves
- Order: Passeriformes
- Family: Cisticolidae
- Genus: Cisticola
- Species: C. woosnami

Binomial name
- Cisticola woosnami Ogilvie-Grant, 1908

= Trilling cisticola =

Species of bird

The trilling cisticola (Cisticola woosnami) is a species of bird in the family Cisticolidae. It is found in Burundi, Democratic Republic of the Congo, Kenya, Malawi, Rwanda, Tanzania, Uganda, and Zambia. Its natural habitats are dry savanna and subtropical or tropical dry lowland grassland.
