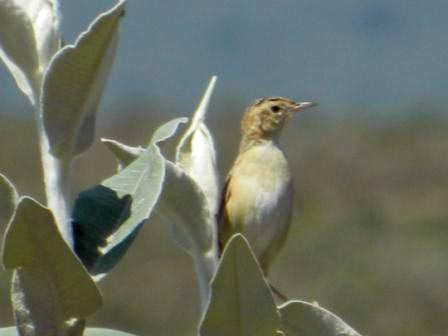
- Female at Gilgil, Kenya

Conservation status
- Least Concern (IUCN 3.1)

Scientific classification
- Kingdom: Animalia
- Phylum: Chordata
- Class: Aves
- Order: Passeriformes
- Family: Cisticolidae
- Genus: Cisticola
- Species: C. eximius

Binomial name
- Cisticola eximius (Heuglin, 1869)

= Black-backed cisticola =

Species of bird

The black-backed cisticola or black-necked cisticola (Cisticola eximius) is a species of passerine bird in the family Cisticolidae. It is found in Burkina Faso, Chad, Republic of the Congo, Democratic Republic of the Congo, Ivory Coast, Eritrea, Ethiopia, Ghana, Guinea, Guinea-Bissau, Kenya, Mali, Nigeria, Senegal, Sierra Leone, South Sudan, Tanzania, Togo, and Uganda. Its natural habitats are subtropical or tropical dry lowland grassland and subtropical or tropical seasonally wet or flooded lowland grassland.

== Taxonomy ==
The black-backed cisticola was described by the German explorer and ornithologist Theodor von Heuglin in 1869 from a specimen collected near the Bahr el Ghazal River in South Sudan. He coined the binomial name Drymoeca eximia. The specific epithet eximius is the Latin for "select" or "distinguished". The species is now placed in the genus Cisticola which was erected by the German naturalist Johann Jakob Kaup in 1829.

Three subspecies are recognised:

- C. e. occidens Lynes, 1930 – south Senegal to Nigeria
- C. e. winneba Lynes, 1931 – south Ghana
- C. e. eximius (Heuglin, 1869) – Congo and Central African Republic to Eritrea, Ethiopia, west Kenya and north Tanzania
