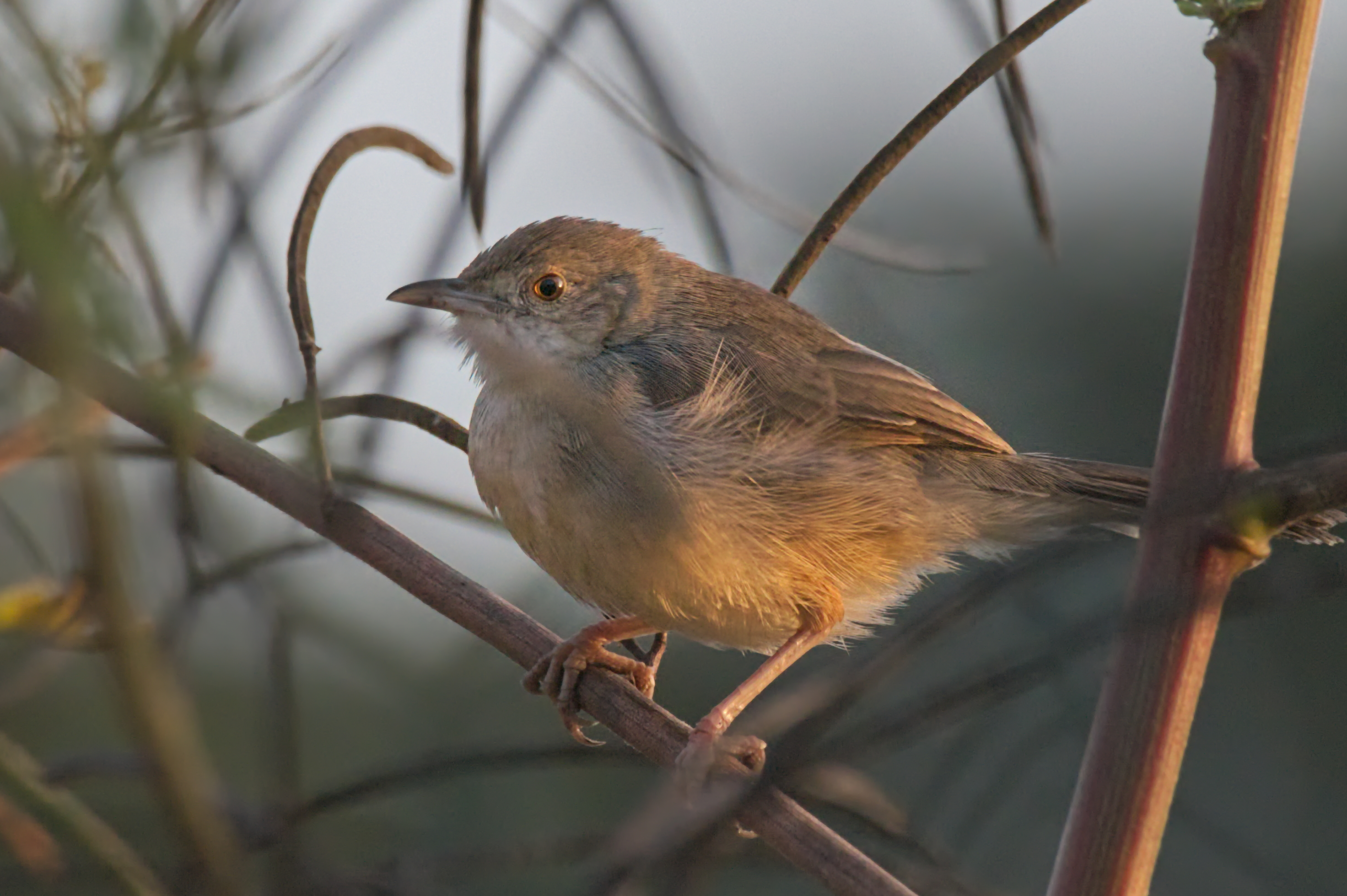

Conservation status
- Least Concern (IUCN 3.1)

Scientific classification
- Kingdom: Animalia
- Phylum: Chordata
- Class: Aves
- Order: Passeriformes
- Family: Cisticolidae
- Genus: Cisticola
- Species: C. bulliens

Binomial name
- Cisticola bulliens Lynes, 1930

= Bubbling cisticola =

Species of bird

The bubbling cisticola (Cisticola bulliens) is a species of bird in the family Cisticolidae. It is found in Angola and Democratic Republic of the Congo. Its natural habitats are dry savanna and subtropical or tropical dry lowland grassland.

The song of the bird is variable, but its typical pattern is a couple of "che" notes followed by a long, liquid trill; overall, the song is very similar to the songs of chattering and rattling cisticolas. The bird gives squeaky whistles and scolding calls.
