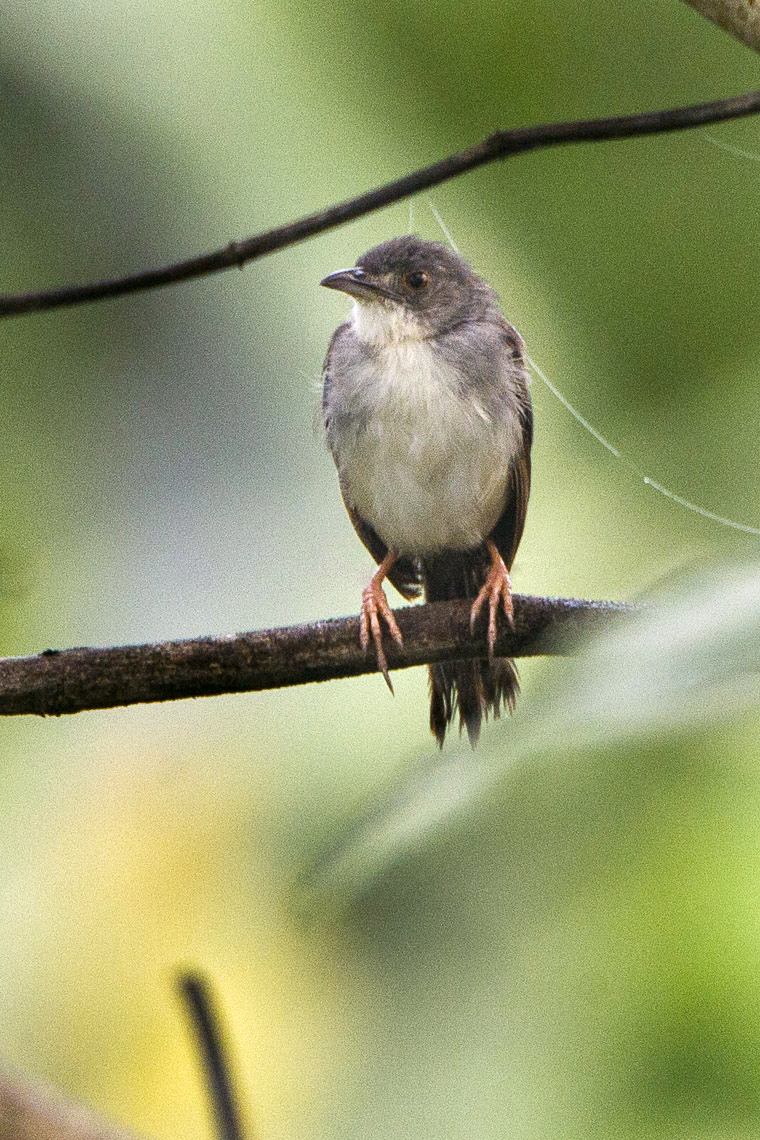
- In Ghana

Conservation status
- Least Concern (IUCN 3.1)

Scientific classification
- Kingdom: Animalia
- Phylum: Chordata
- Class: Aves
- Order: Passeriformes
- Family: Cisticolidae
- Genus: Cisticola
- Species: C. lateralis

Binomial name
- Cisticola lateralis (Fraser, 1843)

= Whistling cisticola =

Species of bird

The whistling cisticola (Cisticola lateralis) is a species of bird in the Cisticolidae family. It is native to the African tropical rainforest and adjacent areas. Its natural habitats include subtropical or tropical dry forests, dry savanna, and moist savanna.

== Taxonomy ==
The whistling cisticola was formally described in 1843 by the British zoologist and collector Louis Fraser under the binomial name Drymoica lateralis based on a specimen collected near Cape Palmas in the south of Liberia. The specific epithet lateralis is Latin meaning "of the side" or "lateral". The whistling cisticola is now one of 53 species placed in the genus Cisticola that was introduced in 1829 by the German naturalist Johann Jakob Kaup.

Three subspecies are recognised:

- C. l. lateralis (Fraser, 1843) – Senegal and Gambia to Cameroon
- C. l. antinorii (Heuglin, 1867) – Central African Republic to west Kenya
- C. l. modestus (Barboza du Bocage, 1880) – Gabon to north Angola, south DR Congo and north Zambia

== Description ==
The whistling cisticola is a mid-sized bird that has a body length of 13–16 cm with a male weight of 14-21 grams, and female weight of 12-19 grams. A breeding, male cisticola is described to have gray-brown cheeks and a sooty-brown crown and underparts. Its tail is also a gray-brown color with the main body being mostly dark brown, with hints of reddish-brown. Also, the majority of males consist of a white colored throat, black bill, and dull pink legs. When male cisticolas are non-breeding, they appear a more reddish-brown color, have a richer buff below, and a gray color on their breast. Female cisticolas often have paler feathers, a more brownish bill, and have a more slender body shape than males. Juveniles are more slender than adults and are washed yellow below. Their bills are brown with bits of yellow and some have bright red underparts. The antinorii race is a paler brown with a fluffier build, and no seasonal plumage changes. The modestus race is smaller in size and more red throughout its feathers, along with a gray-brown crown.

== Distribution and habitat ==
This species has a large range and its population trend appears to be stable, hence it does not approach the thresholds for vulnerable under the range size or population trend criterion. The antinorii subspecies can be found from the Central African Republic to West Kenya, the lateralis from Senegambia to Nigeria and Cameroon, and the modestus from Gabon to North Angola and South Democratic Republic of Congo.

== Behaviour ==
=== Food and feeding ===
The diet of whistling cisticolas mainly consists of different insects and vertebrates.These include termites (Isoptera), beetles (Coleoptera), grasshoppers (Orthoptera), bugs (Hemiptera), and spiders (Araneae). They usually hunt and forage in families and groups, rarely alone. These groups will extract nutrients from various vegetation on or close to the ground.

=== Breeding ===
Male cisticolas are polygamous, but have solitary and territorial breeding periods. They will sing from raised perches, in close eyesight for the females, and occasionally make display flights. The females will build discreet nests often shaped in an ovular pattern with side entrances. They are made from dry grass and living leaves that are bound together with cobwebs, and extra leaves atop to create camouflage. A common nest tends to lay about 0.2 - 0.6 meter above the ground. The average clutch is about 2-3 eggs and the chicks are fed by both the male and the female.
