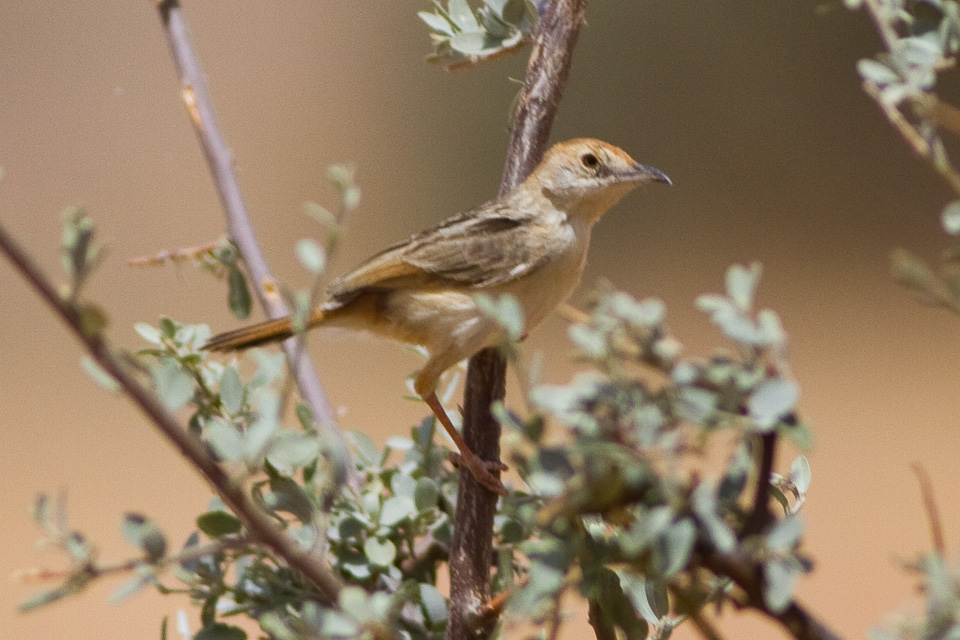
- In Cameroon

Conservation status
- Least Concern (IUCN 3.1)

Scientific classification
- Kingdom: Animalia
- Phylum: Chordata
- Class: Aves
- Order: Passeriformes
- Family: Cisticolidae
- Genus: Cisticola
- Species: C. ruficeps

Binomial name
- Cisticola ruficeps (Cretzschmar, 1830)

= Red-pate cisticola =

Species of bird

The red-pate cisticola (Cisticola ruficeps) is a species of bird in the family Cisticolidae. It is found in Benin, Burkina Faso, Cameroon, Central African Republic, Chad, Ivory Coast, Eritrea, Ethiopia, Gambia, Ghana, Guinea-Bissau, Kenya, Mali, Niger, Nigeria, Senegal, Sierra Leone, Sudan, Togo, and Uganda. Its natural habitats are dry savanna and swamps.
