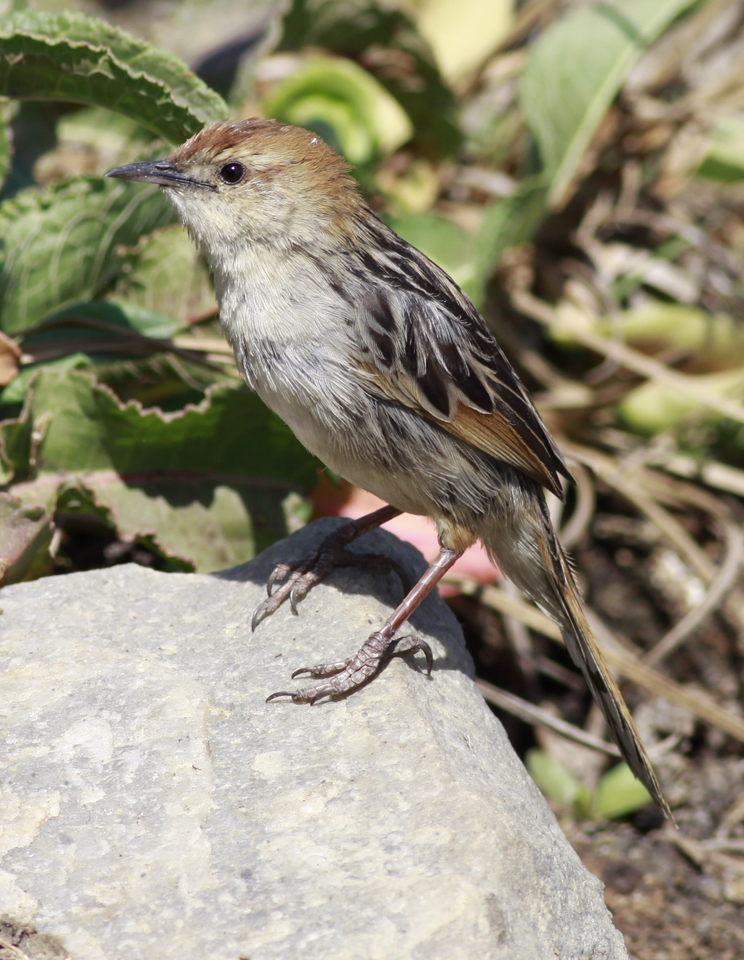

Conservation status
- Least Concern (IUCN 3.1)

Scientific classification
- Kingdom: Animalia
- Phylum: Chordata
- Class: Aves
- Order: Passeriformes
- Family: Cisticolidae
- Genus: Cisticola
- Species: C. tinniens

Binomial name
- Cisticola tinniens (Lichtenstein, MHC, 1842)

Synonyms
- Drymoica levallantii Smith, A, 1842

= Levaillant's cisticola =

Species of bird

Levaillant's cisticola (Cisticola tinniens), also known as the tinkling cisticola, is a small passerine bird which is native to marshlands in the uplands of Africa, southwards of the equator.

== Taxonomy ==
Levaillant's cisticola was formally described in 1842 by the German naturalist Hinrich Lichtenstein under the binomial name Malurus tinniens. The type locality is the Vaal River in South Africa. The specific epithet tinniens is Latin meaning "tinkling" or "ringing". Levaillant's cisticola is now one of 53 species placed in the genus Cisticola that was introduced in 1829 by the German naturalist Johann Jakob Kaup.

The Scottish zoologist Andrew Smith also described Levaillant's cisticola in 1842. He chose the binomial name Drymoica levallantii where the specific epithet honoured the memory of the French naturalist François Levaillant. The name Drymoica levallantii Smith, 1842 is now considered to be a junior synonym of Malurus tinniens Lichtenstein, 1842. In 1876 the English ornithologist Richard Bowdler Sharpe used the English name "Le Vaillant's Fantail Warbler" in the second edition of Edgar Layard's The Birds of South Africa.

Six subspecies are recognised:

- C. t. dyleffi Prigogine, 1952 – east DR Congo
- C. t. oreophilus Van Someren, 1922 – west, central Kenya
- C. t. shiwae White, CMN, 1947 – southeast DR Congo, southwest Tanzania and east Zambia
- C. t. perpullus Hartert, EJO, 1920 – Angola, south DR Congo and west Zambia
- C. t. tinniens (Lichtenstein, MHC, 1842) – Zimbabwe, west Mozambique and South Africa
- C. t. elegans (Hartlaub & Finsch, 1870) – southwest South Africa

== Description ==
Levaillant's cisticola is a small, 12–15 cm long, dull-coloured bird with a longish tail and a reddish cap. The upperparts of the breeding adult are grey, heavily streaked with black, and with a rufous panel in the folded wing. The supercilium, face and underparts are buffy white and the tail is russet brown. The short straight bill is blackish-brown with a pinkish base, and the feet and legs are pinkish-brown. The eye is light brown. Non-breeding adults are browner-backed, and juvenile birds have yellower underparts. The calls include a musical chrip-trrrup-trreee, a wailing tee tee tee and harsh alarm notes.

== Distribution and habitat ==
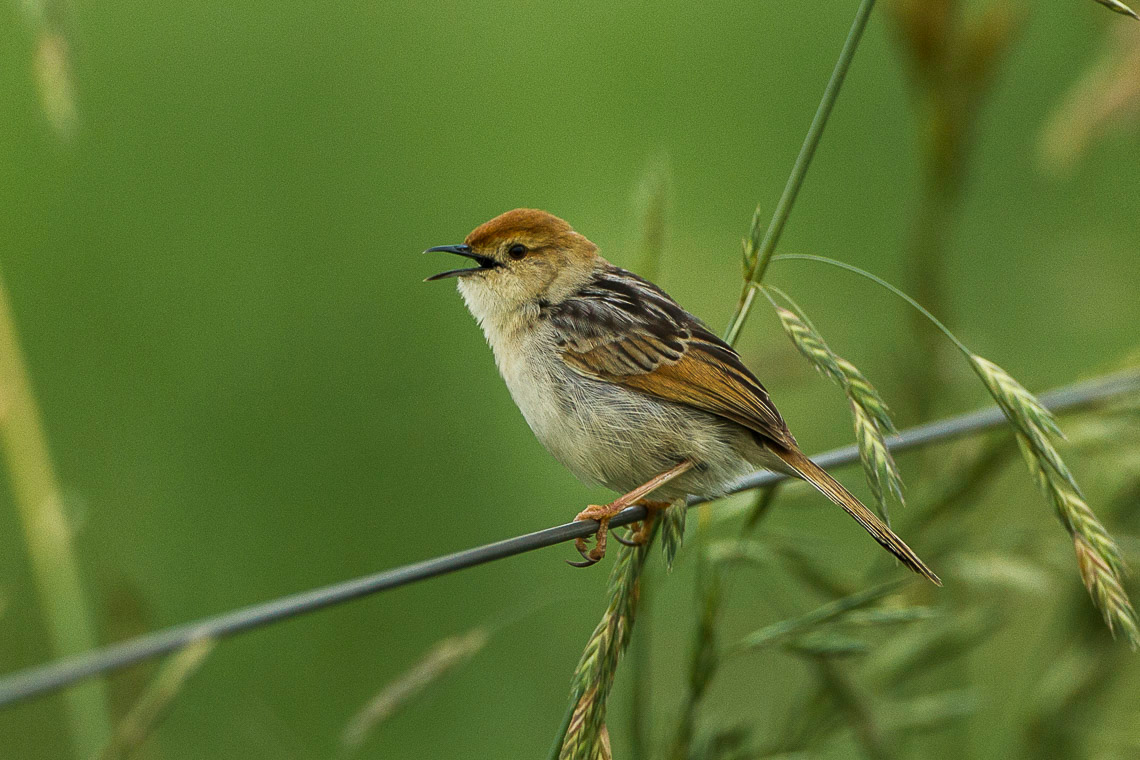
Singing from a fence in marshland, South Africa

The cisticola is a resident breeder in eastern Africa from Kenya to eastern South Africa. It is common in reedbeds, sedges, rank grass, and similar wet habitats usually near rivers or dams.

== Behaviour ==
Levaillant's cisticola is usually seen in pairs, singly, or in small family parties. Flitting through the grass as it forages for small insects. It is vocal and conspicuous, perching on the top of tall grass stems and reeds and making its alarm call.

=== Breeding ===
The cisticola builds a ball-shaped nest with a side entrance from dry grass, cobwebs and felted plant down. It is usually placed in a tuft of grass or weeds, which are standing in, or hanging over water. Nesting occurs from August to October.

== Conservation status ==
This common species has a large range, with an estimated extent of 1,400,000 km^{2}. The population size is believed to be large, and the species is not believed to approach the thresholds for the population decline criterion of the IUCN Red List (i.e. declining more than 30% in ten years or three generations). For these reasons, the species is evaluated as least concern.
