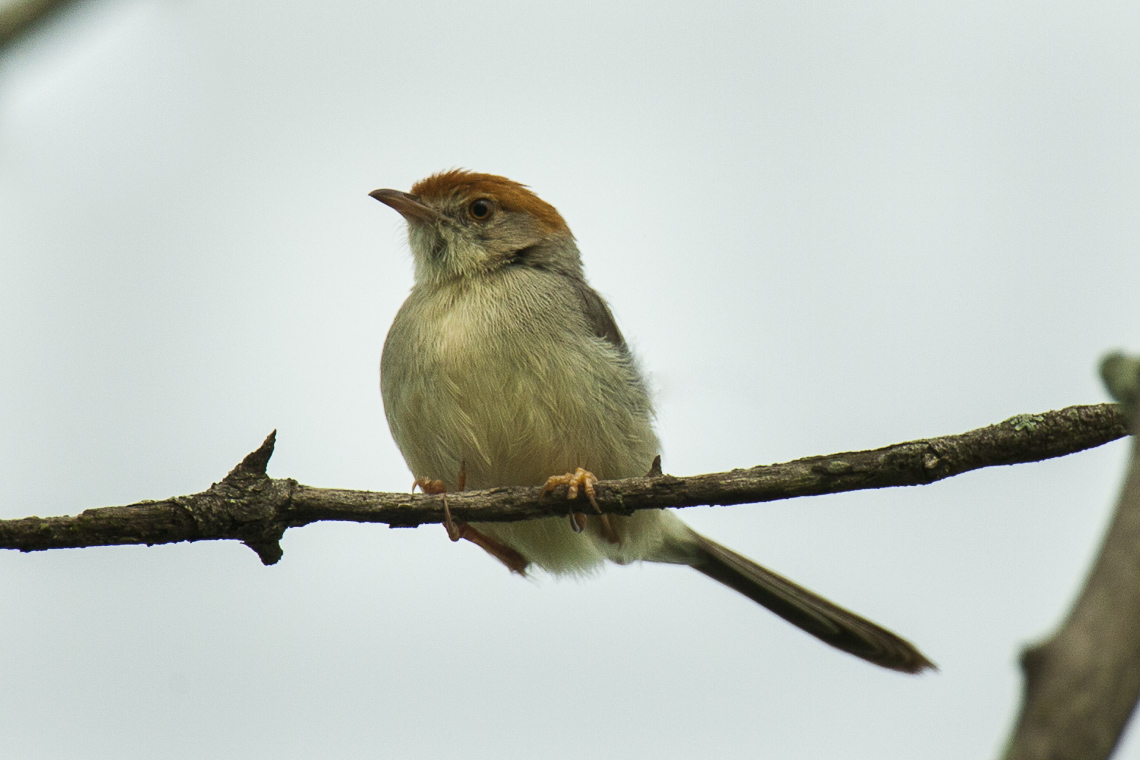
- In Uganda

Conservation status
- Least Concern (IUCN 3.1)

Scientific classification
- Kingdom: Animalia
- Phylum: Chordata
- Class: Aves
- Order: Passeriformes
- Family: Cisticolidae
- Genus: Cisticola
- Species: C. angusticauda

Binomial name
- Cisticola angusticauda Reichenow, 1891

= Long-tailed cisticola =

Tabora cisticola

Species of bird

The long-tailed cisticola (Cisticola angusticauda), also known as the Tabora cisticola, is a species of bird in the family Cisticolidae. It is widespread across Zambia, Tanzania and neighbouring areas.
