= List of cisticolids =

Cisticolas and allies form the bird family Cisticolidae. The International Ornithological Congress (IOC) recognizes these 166 species in the family; 53 are in genus Cisticola and the rest are distributed among 25 other genera.

This list is presented according to the IOC taxonomic sequence and can also be sorted alphabetically by common name and binomial.

Common name	Binomial name	IOC sequence
Common jery	Neomixis tenella (Hartlaub, 1866)	1
Green jery	Neomixis viridis (Sharpe, 1883)	2
Stripe-throated jery	Neomixis striatigula Sharpe, 1881	3
Red-faced cisticola	Cisticola erythrops (Hartlaub, 1857)	4
Singing cisticola	Cisticola cantans (Heuglin, 1869)	5
Whistling cisticola	Cisticola lateralis (Fraser, 1843)	6
Trilling cisticola	Cisticola woosnami Ogilvie-Grant, 1908	7
Chattering cisticola	Cisticola anonymus (Müller, JW, 1855)	8
Bubbling cisticola	Cisticola bulliens Lynes, 1930	9
Hunter's cisticola	Cisticola hunteri Shelley, 1889	10
Chubb's cisticola	Cisticola chubbi Shelley, 1892	11
Kilombero cisticola	Cisticola bakerorum Fjeldså, Dinesen, Davies, Irestedt, Krabbe, Hansen & Bowie, 2021	12
Black-lored cisticola	Cisticola nigriloris Shelley, 1897	13
Rock-loving cisticola	Cisticola aberrans (Smith, A, 1843)	14
Huambo cisticola	Cisticola bailunduensis [[[Oscar Neumann|Neumann]], 1931	15
Rattling cisticola	Cisticola chiniana (Smith, A, 1843)	16
Boran cisticola	Cisticola bodessa Mearns, 1913	17
Churring cisticola	Cisticola njombe Lynes, 1933	18
Ashy cisticola	Cisticola cinereolus Salvadori, 1888	19
Tana River cisticola	Cisticola restrictus Traylor, 1967	20
Tinkling cisticola	Cisticola rufilatus (Hartlaub, 1870)	21
Grey-backed cisticola	Cisticola subruficapilla (Smith, A, 1843)	22
Wailing cisticola	Cisticola lais (Hartlaub & Finsch, 1870)	23
Lynes's cisticola	Cisticola distinctus Lynes, 1930	24
Rufous-winged cisticola	Cisticola galactotes (Temminck, 1821)	25
Winding cisticola	Cisticola marginatus (Heuglin, 1869)	26
Coastal cisticola	Cisticola haematocephalus Cabanis, 1868	27
White-tailed cisticola	Cisticola anderseni Fjeldså, Dinesen, Davies, Irestedt, Krabbe, Hansen & Bowie, 2021	28
Ethiopian cisticola	Cisticola lugubris (Rüppell, 1840)	29
Luapula cisticola	Cisticola luapula Lynes, 1933	30
Chirping cisticola	Cisticola pipiens Lynes, 1930	31
Carruthers's cisticola	Cisticola carruthersi Ogilvie-Grant, 1909	32
Levaillant's cisticola	Cisticola tinniens (Lichtenstein, MHC, 1842)	33
Stout cisticola	Cisticola robustus (Rüppell, 1845)	34
Aberdare cisticola	Cisticola aberdare Lynes, 1930	35
Croaking cisticola	Cisticola natalensis (Smith, A, 1843)	36
Red-pate cisticola	Cisticola ruficeps (Cretzschmar, 1830)	37
Dorst's cisticola	Cisticola guinea Lynes, 1930	38
Tiny cisticola	Cisticola nana Fischer, GA & Reichenow, 1884	39
Short-winged cisticola	Cisticola brachypterus (Sharpe, 1870)	40
Rufous cisticola	Cisticola rufus (Fraser, 1843)	41
Foxy cisticola	Cisticola troglodytes (Antinori, 1864)	42
Neddicky	Cisticola fulvicapilla (Vieillot, 1817)	43
Long-tailed cisticola	Cisticola angusticauda Reichenow, 1891	44
Black-tailed cisticola	Cisticola melanurus (Cabanis, 1882)	45
Zitting cisticola	Cisticola juncidis (Rafinesque, 1810)	46
Socotra cisticola	Cisticola haesitatus (Sclater, PL & Hartlaub, 1881)	47
Madagascar cisticola	Cisticola cherina (Smith, A, 1843)	48
Desert cisticola	Cisticola aridulus Witherby, 1900	49
Cloud cisticola	Cisticola textrix (Vieillot, 1817)	50
Black-backed cisticola	Cisticola eximius (Heuglin, 1869)	51
Dambo cisticola	Cisticola dambo Lynes, 1931	52
Pectoral-patch cisticola	Cisticola brunnescens Heuglin, 1862	53
Pale-crowned cisticola	Cisticola cinnamomeus Reichenow, 1904	54
Wing-snapping cisticola	Cisticola ayresii Hartlaub, 1863	55
Golden-headed cisticola	Cisticola exilis (Vigors & Horsfield, 1827)	56
Socotra warbler	Incana incana (Sclater, PL & Hartlaub, 1881)	57
Himalayan prinia	Prinia crinigera Hodgson, 1836	58
Striped prinia	Prinia striata Swinhoe, 1859	59
Brown prinia	Prinia polychroa (Temminck, 1828)	60
Burmese prinia	Prinia cooki (Harington, 1913)	61
Annam prinia	Prinia rocki Deignan, 1957	62
Black-throated prinia	Prinia atrogularis (Moore, F, 1854)	63
Rufous-crowned prinia	Prinia khasiana (Godwin-Austen, 1876)	64
Hill prinia	Prinia superciliaris (Anderson, 1871)	65
Grey-crowned prinia	Prinia cinereocapilla Moore, F, 1854	66
Rufous-fronted prinia	Prinia buchanani Blyth, 1844	67
Rufescent prinia	Prinia rufescens Blyth, 1847	68
Grey-breasted prinia	Prinia hodgsonii Blyth, 1844	69
Graceful prinia	Prinia gracilis (Lichtenstein, MHC, 1823)	70
Delicate prinia	Prinia lepida Blyth, 1844	71
Jungle prinia	Prinia sylvatica Jerdon, 1840	72
Bar-winged prinia	Prinia familiaris Horsfield, 1821	73
Yellow-bellied prinia	Prinia flaviventris (Delessert, 1840)	74
Ashy prinia	Prinia socialis Sykes, 1832	75
Tawny-flanked prinia	Prinia subflava (Gmelin, JF, 1789)	76
Plain prinia	Prinia inornata Sykes, 1832	77
Pale prinia	Prinia somalica (Elliot, DG, 1897)	78
River prinia	Prinia fluviatilis Chappuis, 1974	79
Black-chested prinia	Prinia flavicans (Vieillot, 1821)	80
Karoo prinia	Prinia maculosa (Boddaert, 1783)	81
Drakensberg prinia	Prinia hypoxantha (Sharpe, 1877)	82
Sao Tome prinia	Prinia molleri Barboza du Bocage, 1887	83
Banded prinia	Prinia bairdii (Cassin, 1855)	84
Red-winged prinia	Prinia erythroptera (Jardine, 1849)	85
Red-fronted prinia	Prinia rufifrons Rüppell, 1840	86
White-chinned prinia	Schistolais leucopogon (Cabanis, 1875)	87
Sierra Leone prinia	Schistolais leontica (Bates, GL, 1930)	88
Namaqua warbler	Phragmacia substriata (Smith, A, 1842)	89
Roberts's warbler	Oreophilais robertsi (Benson, 1946)	90
Visayan miniature babbler	Micromacronus leytensis Amadon, 1962	91
Mindanao miniature babbler	Micromacronus sordidus Ripley & Rabor, 1968	92
Green longtail	Urolais epichlorus (Reichenow, 1892)	93
Black-collared apalis	Oreolais pulcher (Sharpe, 1891)	94
Rwenzori apalis	Oreolais ruwenzorii (Jackson, FJ, 1904)	95
Red-winged grey warbler	Drymocichla incana Hartlaub, 1881	96
Cricket warbler	Spiloptila clamans (Cretzschmar, 1826)	97
Buff-bellied warbler	Phyllolais pulchella (Cretzschmar, 1830)	98
Bar-throated apalis	Apalis thoracica (Shaw, 1811)	99
Yellow-throated apalis	Apalis flavigularis Shelley, 1893	100
Taita apalis	Apalis fuscigularis Moreau, 1938	101
Namuli apalis	Apalis lynesi Vincent, 1933	102
Rudd's apalis	Apalis ruddi Grant, CHB, 1908	103
Brown-tailed apalis	Apalis flavocincta (Sharpe, 1882)	104
Yellow-breasted apalis	Apalis flavida (Strickland, 1853)	105
Lowland masked apalis	Apalis binotata Reichenow, 1895	106
Mountain masked apalis	Apalis personata Sharpe, 1902	107
Black-throated apalis	Apalis jacksoni Sharpe, 1891	108
White-winged apalis	Apalis chariessa Reichenow, 1879	109
Black-capped apalis	Apalis nigriceps (Shelley, 1873)	110
Black-headed apalis	Apalis melanocephala (Fischer, GA & Reichenow, 1884)	111
Chirinda apalis	Apalis chirindensis Shelley, 1906	112
Chestnut-throated apalis	Apalis porphyrolaema Reichenow & Neumann, 1895	113
Kabobo apalis	Apalis kaboboensis Prigogine, 1955	114
Chapin's apalis	Apalis chapini Friedmann, 1928	115
Sharpe's apalis	Apalis sharpii Shelley, 1884	116
Buff-throated apalis	Apalis rufogularis (Fraser, 1843)	117
Kungwe apalis	Apalis argentea Moreau, 1941	118
Karamoja apalis	Apalis karamojae (Van Someren, 1921)	119
Maasai apalis	Apalis stronachi (Stuart, S & Collar, 1985)	120
Bamenda apalis	Apalis bamendae Bannerman, 1922	121
Gosling's apalis	Apalis goslingi Alexander, 1908	122
Grey apalis	Apalis cinerea (Sharpe, 1891)	123
Brown-headed apalis	Apalis alticola (Shelley, 1899)	124
Rufous-eared warbler	Malcorus pectoralis Smith, A, 1829	125
Oriole warbler	Hypergerus atriceps (Lesson, RP, 1831)	126
Grey-capped warbler	Eminia lepida Hartlaub, 1881	127
Green-backed camaroptera	Camaroptera brachyura (Vieillot, 1821)	128
Grey-backed camaroptera	Camaroptera brevicaudata (Cretzschmar, 1830)	129
Hartert's camaroptera	Camaroptera harterti Zedlitz, 1911	130
Yellow-browed camaroptera	Camaroptera superciliaris (Fraser, 1843)	131
Olive-green camaroptera	Camaroptera chloronota Reichenow, 1895	132
Grey wren-warbler	Calamonastes simplex (Cabanis, 1878)	133
Miombo wren-warbler	Calamonastes undosus (Reichenow, 1882)	134
Stierling's wren-warbler	Calamonastes stierlingi Reichenow, 1901	135
Barred wren-warbler	Calamonastes fasciolatus (Smith, A, 1847)	136
Cinnamon-breasted warbler	Euryptila subcinnamomea (Smith, A, 1847)	137
Black-headed rufous warbler	Bathmocercus cerviniventris (Sharpe, 1877)	138
Black-faced rufous warbler	Bathmocercus rufus Reichenow, 1895	139
Winifred's warbler	Scepomycter winifredae (Moreau, 1938)	140
Common tailorbird	Orthotomus sutorius (Pennant, 1769)	141
Dark-necked tailorbird	Orthotomus atrogularis Temminck, 1836	142
Cambodian tailorbird	Orthotomus chaktomuk Mahood, John, Eames, JC, Oliveros, Moyle, Chamnan, Poole, Nielsen & Sheldon, 2013	143
Visayan tailorbird	Orthotomus castaneiceps Walden, 1872	144
Green-backed tailorbird	Orthotomus chloronotus Ogilvie-Grant, 1895	145
Rufous-fronted tailorbird	Orthotomus frontalis Sharpe, 1877	146
Grey-backed tailorbird	Orthotomus derbianus Moore, F, 1855	147
Rufous-tailed tailorbird	Orthotomus sericeus Temminck, 1836	148
Ashy tailorbird	Orthotomus ruficeps (Lesson, RP, 1830)	149
Olive-backed tailorbird	Orthotomus sepium Horsfield, 1821	150
White-eared tailorbird	Orthotomus cinereiceps Sharpe, 1877	151
Black-headed tailorbird	Orthotomus nigriceps Tweeddale, 1878	152
Yellow-breasted tailorbird	Orthotomus samarensis Steere, 1890	153
Long-billed forest warbler	Artisornis moreaui (Sclater, WL, 1931)	154
Red-capped forest warbler	Artisornis metopias (Reichenow, 1907)	155
White-tailed warbler	Poliolais lopezi (Alexander, 1903)	156
Yellow-bellied eremomela	Eremomela icteropygialis (Lafresnaye, 1839)	157
Yellow-vented eremomela	Eremomela flavicrissalis Sharpe, 1895	158
Senegal eremomela	Eremomela pusilla Hartlaub, 1857	159
Green-backed eremomela	Eremomela canescens Antinori, 1864	160
Green-capped eremomela	Eremomela scotops Sundevall, 1850	161
Karoo eremomela	Eremomela gregalis (Smith, A, 1829)	162
Burnt-necked eremomela	Eremomela usticollis Sundevall, 1850	163
Rufous-crowned eremomela	Eremomela badiceps (Fraser, 1843)	164
Turner's eremomela	Eremomela turneri Van Someren, 1920	165
Black-necked eremomela	Eremomela atricollis Barboza du Bocage, 1894	166
