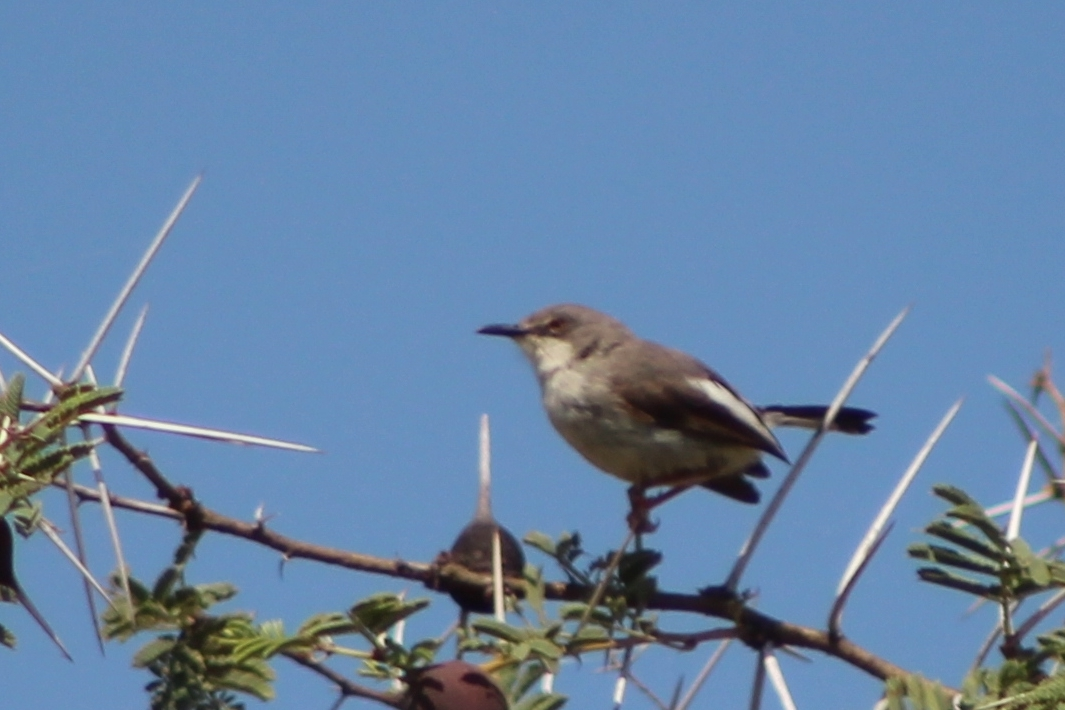
- Maasai apalis seen in Tanzania

Scientific classification
- Kingdom: Animalia
- Phylum: Chordata
- Class: Aves
- Order: Passeriformes
- Family: Cisticolidae
- Genus: Apalis
- Species: A. stronachi

Binomial name
- Apalis stronachi Stuart & Collar, 1985

= Maasai apalis =

Species of bird

The Maasai apalis (Apalis stronachi), is a species of passerine in the family Cisticolidae. It is native to Tanzania and southwest Kenya. It was formerly considered a subspecies of Karamoja apalis until being split in 2024 by the IOC and Clements checklist.

== Taxonomy ==
The Maasai apalis was first described by Simon Stuart and Nigel Collar in 1985. It was described as a new subspecies of Karamoja apalis under the name A. k. stronachi, after B.W.H. Stronach, who collected the holotype in 1962 from Ngorongoro in Tanzania. A 2023 study suggested that the two should be split based on acoustic and morphological evidence. This was done by both the IOC and Clements checklist a year later in 2024. Its common name comes from the Maasai people, who live within the range of the species. The Maasai apalis is monotypic.

== Description ==
The Maasai apalis is a small bird, being slightly larger than the related Karamoja apalis. It differs from the Karamoja apalis by its slaty grey mottled breast and flanks. Females can be told apart from males by their dark underparts. Both sexes have a red or orange iris, a long black bill, grey upperparts, a black and white tail, and pink legs. Both sexes also have white lines on their wing and the rectrices of their tail, thought to mimic the long white spines of the whistling thorn.

=== Call description ===
The duets performed by male and female Maasai apalis are made of long slurred notes done in repetition. One individual in the duet sings an ascending note and the other sings a descending note. Individuals will switch which part of the duet they are playing, and a pair that can continue to synchronize with each other will mate.

== Distribution and habitat ==
The Maasai apalis is found in the highlands of north central Tanzania and slightly north into southwest Kenya. Places where it is found include Songwe, Arusha, Tabora, Maasai Mara, and the Serengeti. The species is only found in patches of whistling thorn that are very tall and dense.
