= Simon Stewart =

Simon Stewart may refer to:

- Simon Stewart (footballer) (born 1973), English football defender
- Simon Patrick Stewart (born 1980), coach and shot putter

== See also ==
- Simon Steward (disambiguation)
- Simeon Stuart (1864–1939), British film actor
- Simon Stuart (disambiguation)
