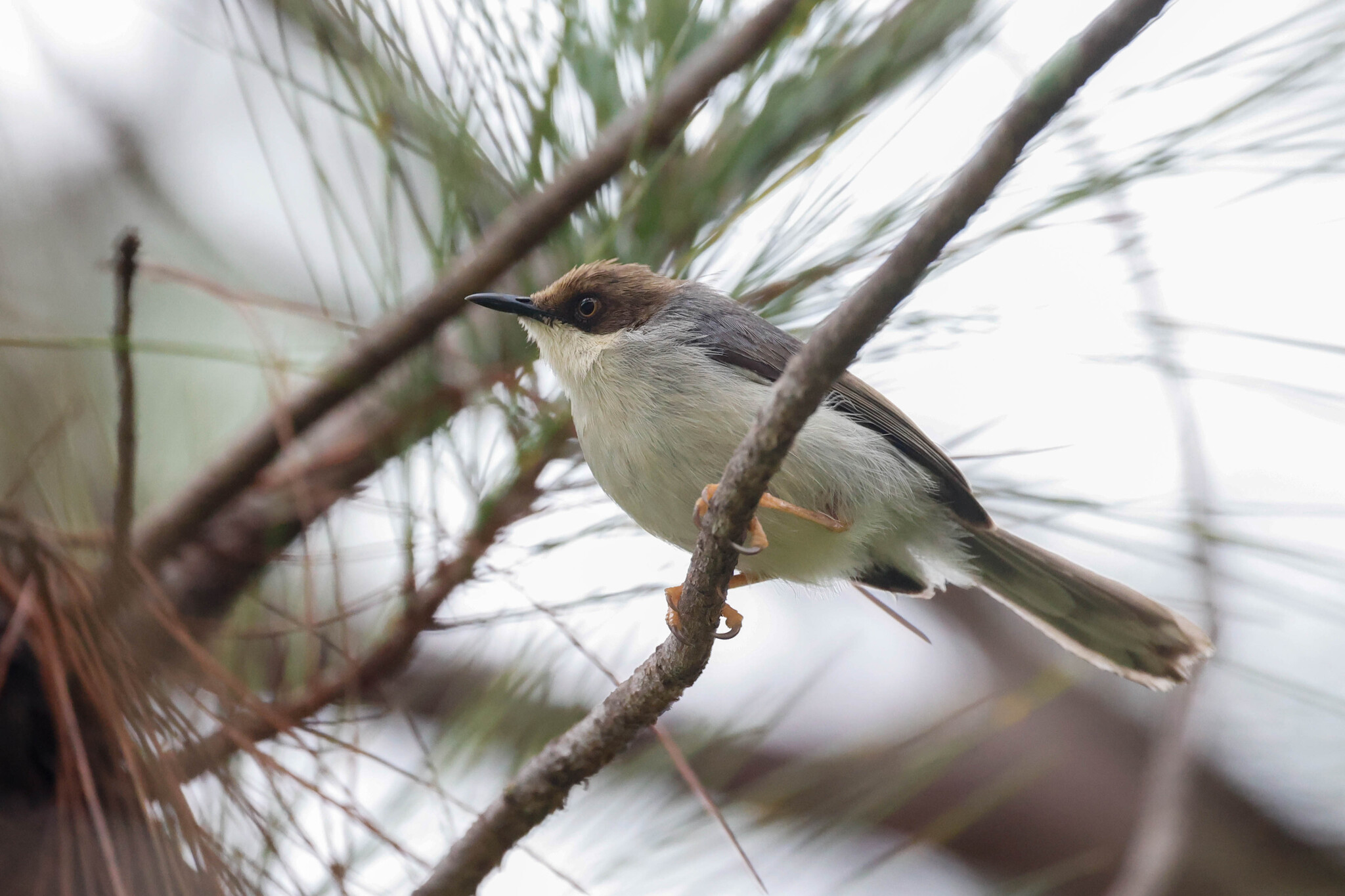

Conservation status
- Least Concern (IUCN 3.1)

Scientific classification
- Kingdom: Animalia
- Phylum: Chordata
- Class: Aves
- Order: Passeriformes
- Family: Cisticolidae
- Genus: Apalis
- Species: A. alticola

Binomial name
- Apalis alticola (Shelley, 1899)

= Brown-headed apalis =

Species of bird

The brown-headed apalis (Apalis alticola) is a small passerine bird belonging to the genus Apalis in the family Cisticolidae. Formerly included within the grey apalis (A. cinerea) but is now commonly considered to be a separate species. It has two subspecies: A. a. alticola and A. a. dowsetti.

== Description ==
It is 12–13 cm long with a long tail and fairly long, slender bill. The legs and feet are pinkish and the eye is pale orange. The upperparts are grey-brown, becoming chocolate-brown on the crown and cheeks. The underparts are whitish. The adult male and female are alike; juvenile birds are more olive above and slightly yellowish below. In A. a. alticola, the outer tail-feathers have white tips and outer webs and the next three pairs of tail-feathers have small white tips. A. a. dowsetti has entirely white outer tail-feathers.

The grey apalis is similar but has a grey-brown head and dark eye. The outer tail-feathers are white like those of A. a. dowsetti but it does not overlap in range with that subspecies.

The song of the brown-headed apalis is a series of loud, high-pitched "chip" notes.

== Distribution and habitat ==
It has a patchy distribution in central and east Africa. It inhabits forest and secondary growth at mid to high altitudes. It is often seen in pairs or small groups and frequently joins other bird species in mixed-species feeding flocks. A. a. alticola occurs in parts of Angola, Zambia, Malawi, south-eastern Democratic Republic of Congo, Tanzania and the Nguruman Escarpment in southern Kenya. In locations where its range overlaps with the grey apalis, it is restricted to the forest edge. A. a. dowsetti is found only on the Marungu plateau in the Democratic Republic of Congo.
