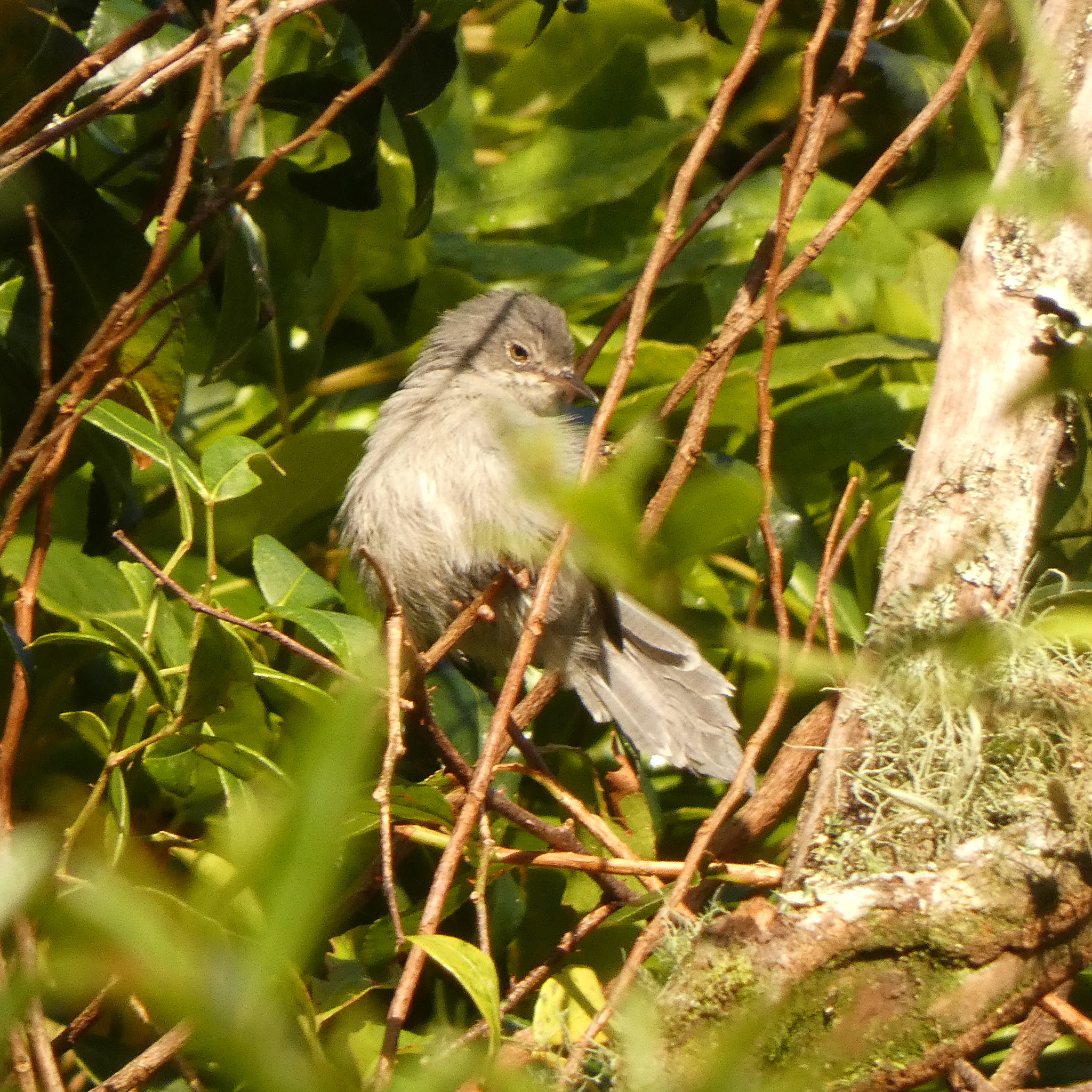

Conservation status
- Vulnerable (IUCN 3.1)

Scientific classification
- Kingdom: Animalia
- Phylum: Chordata
- Class: Aves
- Order: Passeriformes
- Family: Cisticolidae
- Genus: Apalis
- Species: A. chirindensis

Binomial name
- Apalis chirindensis Shelley, 1906
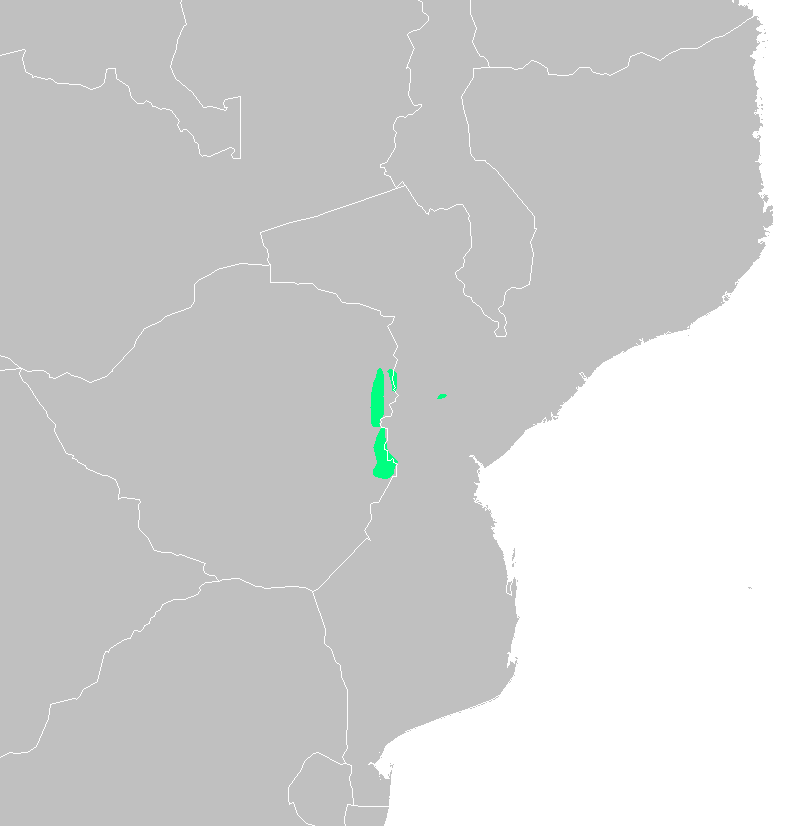
- general range: the montane forest-grassland mosaic

= Chirinda apalis =

Species of bird

The Chirinda apalis (Apalis chirindensis) is a species of passerine bird belonging to the family Cisticolidae. This species is endemic to the Eastern Highlands of Zimbabwe and Mozambique. Its natural habitats are subtropical or tropical moist lowland forest and subtropical or tropical moist montane forest.

== Taxonomy ==
The Chirinda apalis was first formally described in 1906 by the English geologist and ornithologist George Ernest Shelley. The type specimen was collected in June 1905 in the Chirinda Forest in eastern Rhodesia, modern Zimbabwe, at an altitude of 4,000 ft (1,200 m). The Chirinda apalis is classified in the genus Apalis which belongs to the family Cisticolidae, which includes the cisticolas, prinias, tailorbirds, eremomelas and other groups of "African" warblers, formerly classified within the Old World warbler family Sylviidae.

=== Subspecies ===
The Chirinda apalis is divided into two subspecies:

- Apalis chirindensis chirindensis Shelley, 1906 (Mount Gorongosa and adjacent eastern Zimbabwe)
- Apalis chirindensis vumbae Roberts, 1936 (eastern highlands of Zimbabwe)

== Description ==
The Chirinda apalis has the typical slender, long tailed shape of apalises, with a slender bill. The overall colour is dull grey, darker above and paler below with white tips to the tail. The sexes are similar but females show a paler base to the beak. The juveniles are similar to the adults but have more yellow or green tinges to the plumage and also have a paler bill. This species has a length of between 11 and 13 cm (4.3 and 5.1 in).

The subspecies A. c. vumbae differs from the nominate, A. c. chirndensis, in having the maxilla a pale horn colour or dusky with a pale pink mandible, it is also a lighter grey in colour and the feathers of the tail have larger white tips. The nominate subspecies is darker and the males have all black bills and the females may show a pale base to the mandible.

=== Vocalisations ===
The call of the Chirinda aplais is a repeated chip which has been written as "chpip-chipip", or "swick-swick-swick".

== Distribution and habitat ==
The Chrinda apalis is endemic to southeastern Africa where it occurs only in the Eastern Highlands of Zimbabwe and Mozambique and on Mount Gorongosa in Mozambique. In Zimbabwe it occurs from Nyanga National Park south through the Eastern Highlands including the Bvumba Mountains, the Chimanimani Mountains and the Chipinge Uplands, with records from the Honde Valley and the confluence of the Haroni-Rusitu rivers in the winter months which suggest some altitudinal movement outside the breeding season. In Mozambique this species has been recorded from the headwaters of the Pungwe River south to Espungabera, in the Chimanimani Mountains with an isolated population on Mount Gorongosa. The Chirinda apalis is found in the mid-storey and canopy of evergreen forest and dense riverine bush, mostly at altitudes between 1,200 and 2,200 m (3,900 and 7,200 ft).

== Biology ==
The Chirinda apalis is an insectivorous species which feeds mainly on beetles, caterpillars and flies. If frequently participates in mixed species flocks, which travel through the forest picking prey from the leaves and branches in the canopy. In the winter this species has been recorded in mixed bird parties of insectivorous songbirds, particularly those containing the related black-headed apalis (A. melanocephala). Otherwise these two species are parapatric and the black-headed apalis may competitively exclude the Chirinda Apalis from breeding at lower altitudes.

=== Breeding ===
The Chirinda apalis lays its eggs in the spring and summer from October through to February, building a dome shaped, although rather untidy, nest using leaves, lichens, fern fronds and seed cases. This has an entrance on the side and a false entrance on the top and is typically located on a small branch, clothed in moss, around 20 m (66 ft) above the ground.

== Conservation status ==
The Chirinda apalis is classified as Vulnerable by the International Union for Conservation of Nature and BirdLife International as there has been a rapid decline in the species population. The main threat to this species is habitat loss due to deforestation and degradation of the forest, within the 10 years up to 2022 the estimated loss of tree cover within its range has been 35%.
