= Simon Stuart =

Simon Stuart can refer to:

- Simon Stuart (general), Australian Army officer
- Simon Stuart (conservationist) (born 1967), senior conservationist closely associated with IUCN's Species Survival Commission

== See also ==
- Simon Steward (1575–1632), English politician
- Simon Stewart (disambiguation)
- Simeon Stuart (1864–1939), British film actor
