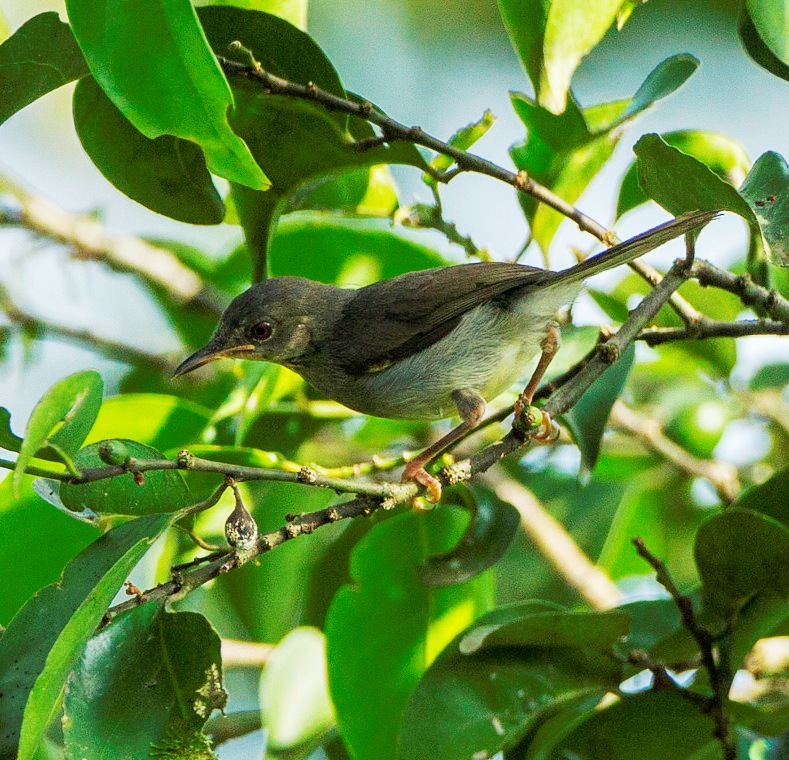
- In Ghana

Conservation status
- Near Threatened (IUCN 3.1)

Scientific classification
- Kingdom: Animalia
- Phylum: Chordata
- Class: Aves
- Order: Passeriformes
- Family: Cisticolidae
- Genus: Apalis
- Species: A. sharpii

Binomial name
- Apalis sharpii Shelley, 1884

= Sharpe's apalis =

Species of bird

Sharpe's apalis (Apalis sharpii) is a species of bird in the family Cisticolidae.

It is found in Côte d'Ivoire, Ghana, Guinea, Liberia, and Sierra Leone. Its natural habitats are subtropical or tropical dry forest and subtropical or tropical moist lowland forest.

Sharpe's apalis was described by the English ornithologist George Ernest Shelley in 1884. He coined the binomial name Apalis sharpii. Both the common name and the specific epithet honour the English ornithologist and museum curator Richard Bowdler Sharpe.
