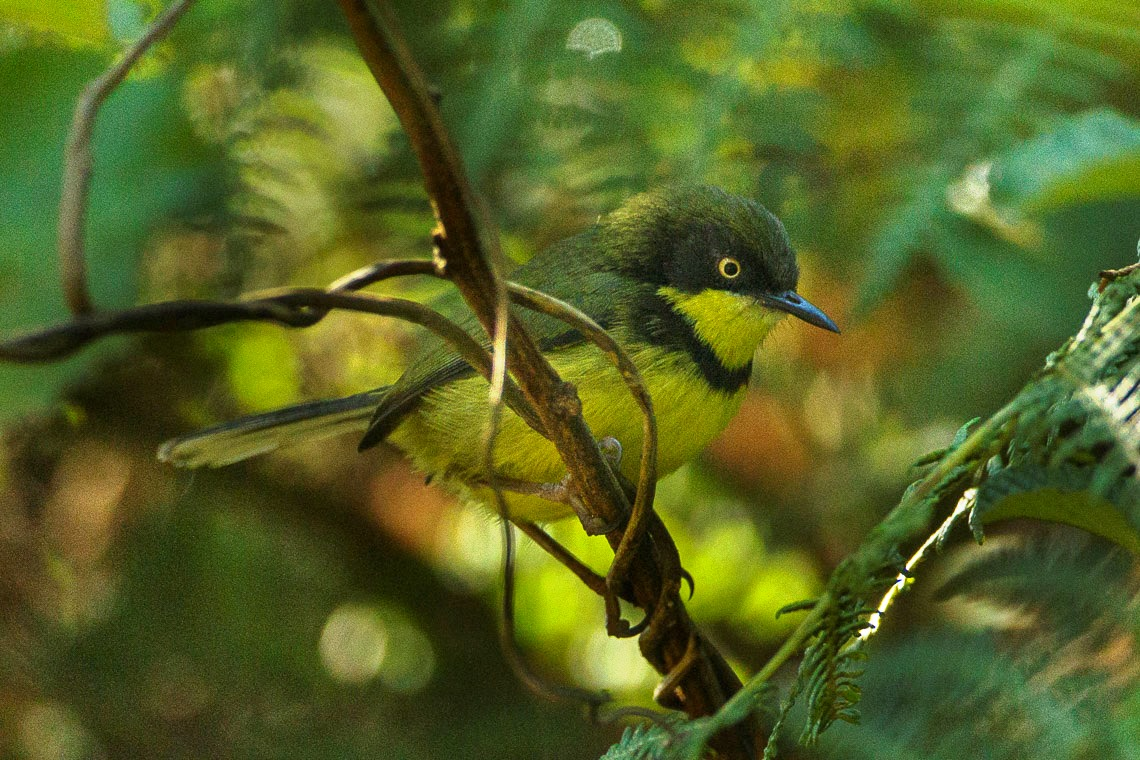
- In Malawi

Conservation status
- Near Threatened (IUCN 3.1)

Scientific classification
- Kingdom: Animalia
- Phylum: Chordata
- Class: Aves
- Order: Passeriformes
- Family: Cisticolidae
- Genus: Apalis
- Species: A. flavigularis

Binomial name
- Apalis flavigularis Shelley, 1893
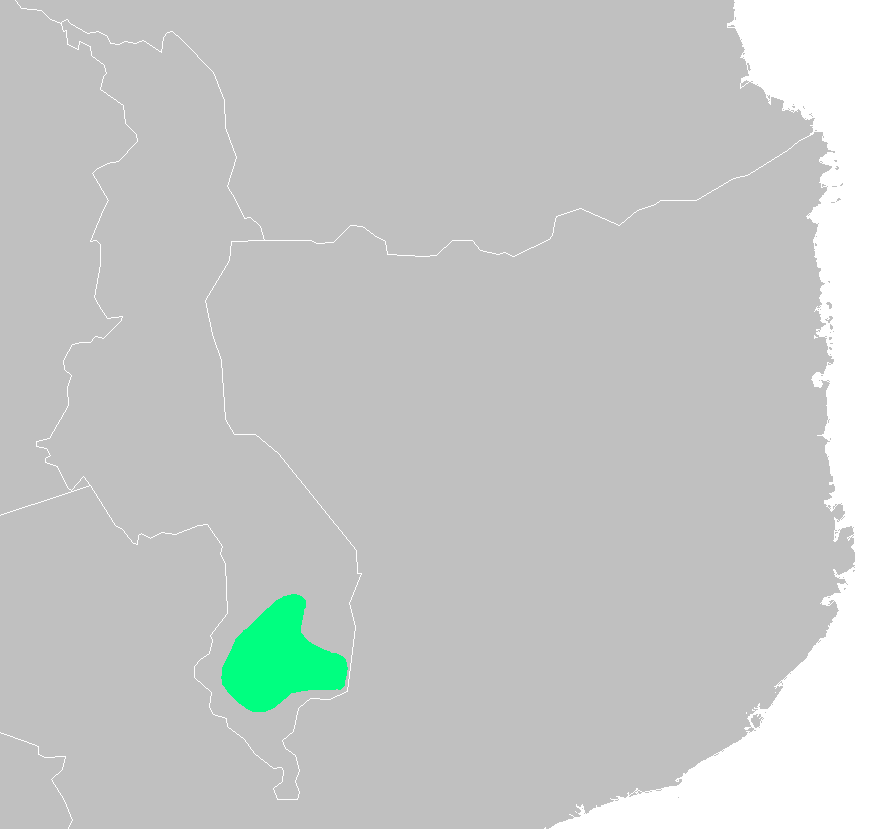
- approximate range: the montane forest-grassland mosaic of southern Malawi

Synonyms
- Apalis thoracica flavigularis

= Yellow-throated apalis =

Species of bird

The yellow-throated apalis (Apalis flavigularis) is a passerine bird in the family Cisticolidae. It is endemic to Malawi. It was formerly considered a subspecies of the bar-throated apalis.

Its natural habitats are subtropical or tropical moist lowland forest and subtropical or tropical moist montane forest. It is threatened by habitat loss.
