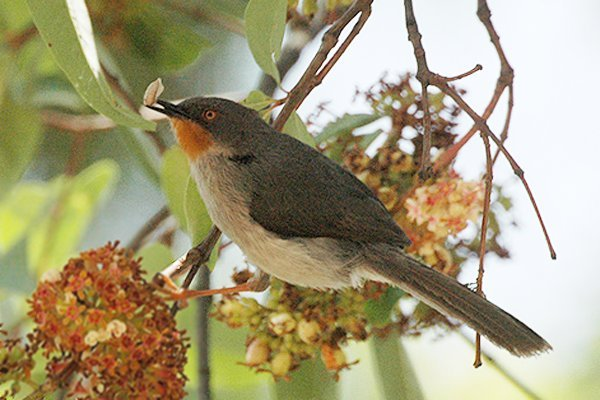
- Chestnut-throated apalis (Apalis porphyrolaema)

Scientific classification
- Kingdom: Animalia
- Phylum: Chordata
- Class: Aves
- Order: Passeriformes
- Family: Cisticolidae
- Genus: Apalis; Swainson, 1833

Type species
- Motacilla thoracica Shaw, 1811

Species
- See species list

= Apalis =

Apalises

Genus of birds

The apalises are small passerine birds belonging to the genus Apalis, in the family Cisticolidae. They are found in forest, woodlands and scrub across most parts of sub-Saharan Africa. They are slender birds with long tails and have a slender bill for catching insects. They are typically brown, grey or green above and several species have brightly coloured underparts. Males and females are usually similar in appearance but the males are sometimes brighter.

== Taxonomy ==
The genus was erected by the English naturalist William Swainson in 1833. The type species is the bar-throated apalis. The name Apalis is from the Ancient Greek hapalos meaning "delicate" or "gentle". Apalises were traditionally classified in the Old World warbler family Sylviidae but are now commonly placed, together with several other groups of mainly African warblers, in a separate family Cisticolidae.

There are about 24 species of apalis; the exact number varies according to differing authorities. The African tailorbird and long-billed tailorbird were formerly considered to be apalises but are now often placed either with the tailorbirds (Orthotomus) or in their own genus Artisornis. The red-fronted prinia or red-faced apalis has also been moved into a different genus, Prinia. Further shuffling may be necessary as a recent study found the genus to be polyphyletic, with two species (black-collared and Ruwenzori apalises) only distantly related to the other three tested.

== Species list ==
The genus contains 26 species:

Image	Common name	Scientific name	Distribution
	Bar-throated apalis	Apalis thoracica	Afromontane and proximate elevated areas of southeastern Africa
	Yellow-throated apalis	Apalis flavigularis	Malawi.
	Taita apalis	Apalis fuscigularis	Kenya
	Namuli apalis	Apalis lynesi	Mozambique
	Rudd's apalis	Apalis ruddi	Mozambique, southern Malawi, South Africa and Eswatini
	Brown-tailed apalis	Apalis flavocincta	Ethiopia, Sudan, and Uganda to Somalia and Kenya
	Yellow-breasted apalis	Apalis flavida	Sub-Saharan Africa
	Lowland masked apalis	Apalis binotata	Angola, Cameroon, Democratic Republic of the Congo, Equatorial Guinea, Gabon, Tanzania, and Uganda
	Mountain masked apalis	Apalis personata	Albertine Rift montane forests
	Black-throated apalis	Apalis jacksoni	Cameroon to Kenya
	White-winged apalis	Apalis chariessa	Kenya, Malawi, Mozambique, and Tanzania
	Black-capped apalis	Apalis nigriceps	African tropical rainforest
	Black-headed apalis	Apalis melanocephala	Kenya, Malawi, Mozambique, Somalia, Tanzania, and Zimbabwe
	Chirinda apalis	Apalis chirindensis	Zimbabwe and Mozambique
	Chestnut-throated apalis	Apalis porphyrolaema	Burundi, Democratic Republic of the Congo, Kenya, Rwanda, Tanzania and Uganda
	Kabobo apalis	Apalis kaboboensis	Democratic Republic of the Congo
	Chapin's apalis or chestnut-headed apalis	Apalis chapini	Malawi, Tanzania, and Zambia
	Sharpe's apalis	Apalis sharpii	Côte d'Ivoire, Ghana, Guinea, Liberia, and Sierra Leone
	Buff-throated apalis	Apalis rufogularis	Angola, Benin, Burundi, Cameroon, Central African Republic, Republic of the Congo, Democratic Republic of the Congo, Equatorial Guinea, Gabon, Kenya, Nigeria, Rwanda, South Sudan, Tanzania, Uganda, and Zambia
	Kungwe apalis	Apalis argentea	Burundi, Democratic Republic of the Congo, Rwanda, and Tanzania
	Karamoja apalis	Apalis karamojae	Tanzania, Uganda and Kenya
	Maasai apalis	Apalis stronachi	Tanzania and Kenya
	Bamenda apalis	Apalis bamendae	Cameroon
	Gosling's apalis	Apalis goslingi	Angola, Cameroon, Central African Republic, Republic of the Congo, Democratic Republic of the Congo, and Gabon
	Grey apalis	Apalis cinerea	Angola, Burundi, Cameroon, Democratic Republic of the Congo, Equatorial Guinea, Gabon, Kenya, Nigeria, Rwanda, South Sudan, Sudan, Tanzania, and Uganda
	Brown-headed apalis	Apalis alticola	Angola, Zambia, Malawi, south-eastern Democratic Republic of Congo, Tanzania and Kenya

Formerly in Apalis but now moved to Oreolais:

- Black-collared apalis, Oreolais pulchra
- Rwenzori apalis or collared apalis, Oreolais ruwenzorii
