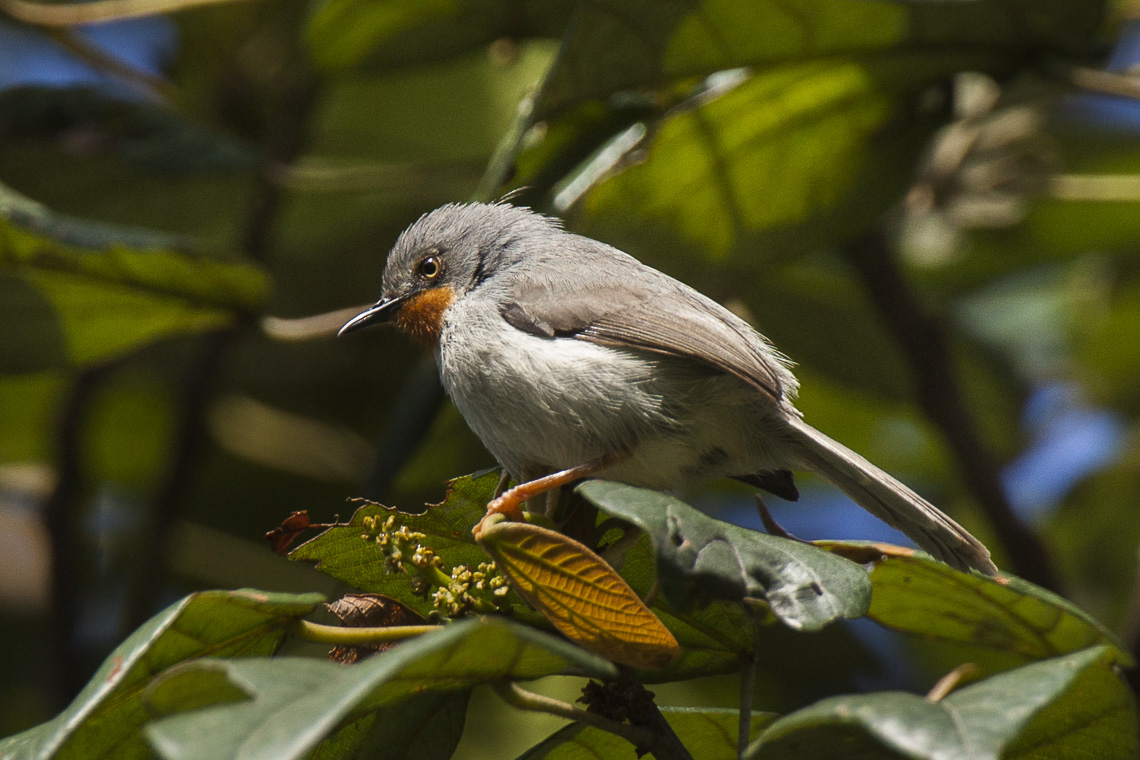
- In Uganda

Conservation status
- Least Concern (IUCN 3.1)

Scientific classification
- Kingdom: Animalia
- Phylum: Chordata
- Class: Aves
- Order: Passeriformes
- Family: Cisticolidae
- Genus: Apalis
- Species: A. porphyrolaema

Binomial name
- Apalis porphyrolaema Reichenow & Neumann, 1895

= Chestnut-throated apalis =

Species of bird

The chestnut-throated apalis (Apalis porphyrolaema) is a species of bird in the cisticola family Cisticolidae. The Kabobo apalis, originally described as a distinct species, is usually treated as a subspecies A. p. kaboboensis of the chestnut-throated apalis today. It is itself sometimes considered to be the same species as the Chapin's apalis.

== Distribution and habitat ==
The species is found in Burundi, Democratic Republic of the Congo, Kenya, Rwanda, Tanzania and Uganda, where it is a species of highland forests above 1600 m.

== Description ==
The chestnut-throated apalis is a 12 cm long apalis with mostly grey plumage. The nominate subspecies and the subspecies affinis both have chestnut throats, whereas the Kabobo apalis has an entirely grey throat but paler undersides.

== Ecology ==
The chestnut-throated apalis feeds on insects and other small invertebrates, which are obtained by gleaning from leaves and twigs, hover gleaning and hawking in the air.
