= Kungwe apalis =

Conservation status
- Least Concern (IUCN 3.1)

Scientific classification
- Kingdom: Animalia
- Phylum: Chordata
- Class: Aves
- Order: Passeriformes
- Family: Cisticolidae
- Genus: Apalis
- Species: A. argentea

Binomial name
- Apalis argentea Moreau, 1941

Synonyms
- Apalis rufogularis argentea; Apalis argentea eidos Peters & Loveridge, 1942

Species of bird

The Kungwe apalis (Apalis argentea) is a species in the family Cisticolidae. It was previously considered it to be a subspecies of the buff-throated apalis. It is found in Burundi, Democratic Republic of the Congo, Rwanda, and Tanzania.

Its natural habitats are subtropical or tropical dry forest and subtropical or tropical moist montane forest. It is threatened by habitat loss.
