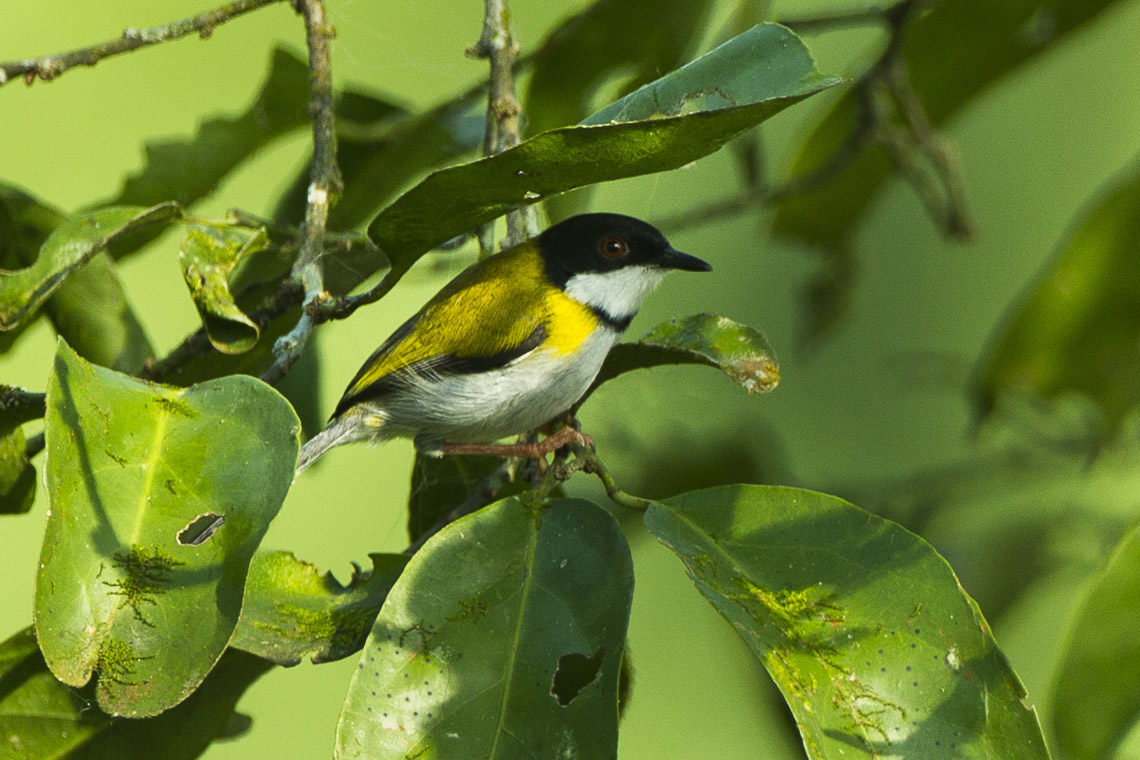
- In Ghana

Conservation status
- Least Concern (IUCN 3.1)

Scientific classification
- Kingdom: Animalia
- Phylum: Chordata
- Class: Aves
- Order: Passeriformes
- Family: Cisticolidae
- Genus: Apalis
- Species: A. nigriceps

Binomial name
- Apalis nigriceps (Shelley, 1873)

= Black-capped apalis =

Species of bird

The black-capped apalis (Apalis nigriceps) is a species of bird in the family Cisticolidae. It is sparsely distributed throughout the tropical rainforest of Sub-Saharan Africa.
