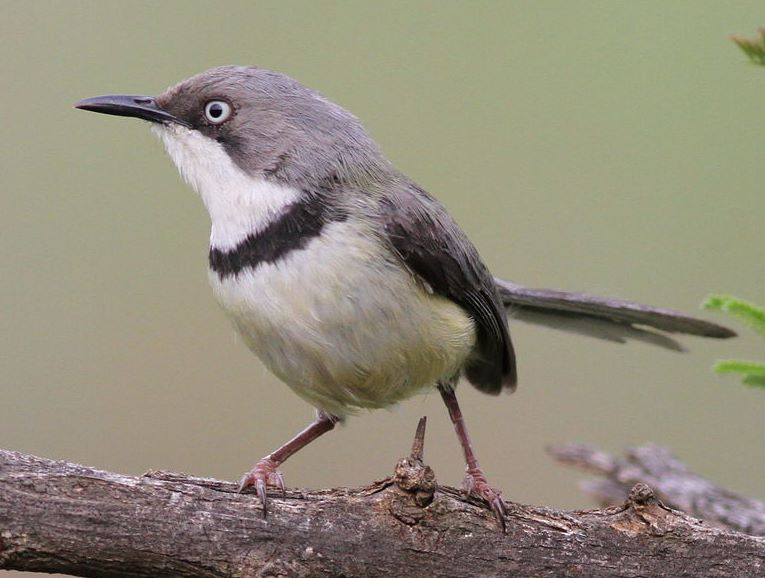
- A. t. flaviventris at Marakele National Park, South Africa

Conservation status
- Least Concern (IUCN 3.1)

Scientific classification
- Kingdom: Animalia
- Phylum: Chordata
- Class: Aves
- Order: Passeriformes
- Family: Cisticolidae
- Genus: Apalis
- Species: A. thoracica

Binomial name
- Apalis thoracica (Shaw, 1811)

= Bar-throated apalis =

Species of bird

The bar-throated apalis (Apalis thoracica) is a small African passerine bird belonging to the genus Apalis of the family Cisticolidae. It is native to the eastern and southern Afrotropics.

== Range and habitat ==
It inhabits forest and scrub in Southern and East Africa from southern and eastern parts of South Africa north as far as the Chyulu Hills in Kenya. In the northern part of is range it is found only in highland areas where there are a number of subspecies restricted to isolated mountain ranges. Some of these may be treated as separate species including the Namuli apalis (A. lynesi) in Mozambique, yellow-throated apalis (A. flavigularis) of Malawi and Taita apalis (A. fascigularis) in Kenya.

== Description ==
The bar-throated apalis is a slender bird with a long tail and is 11 to 13 cm in length. The plumage varies depending on the subspecies: the upper parts can be grey or green while the underparts are white or pale yellow. All forms have a narrow black band across the breast, white outer tail-feathers and a pale eye. The black bill is fairly long and slender and is slightly curved. Females are similar to males but have a narrower breast band. Juveniles have buffer underparts and may have an incomplete breast band.

== Behaviour ==
Pairs sing a duetting song with the female's call being higher-pitched than that of the male.

The oval, purse-shaped nest is made mainly of plant material. Three eggs are laid, these are bluish-white with reddish-brown spots. The breeding season lasts from August to January.

This species forages for caterpillars and other insects amongst vegetation, often forming mixed-species flocks with other birds.
