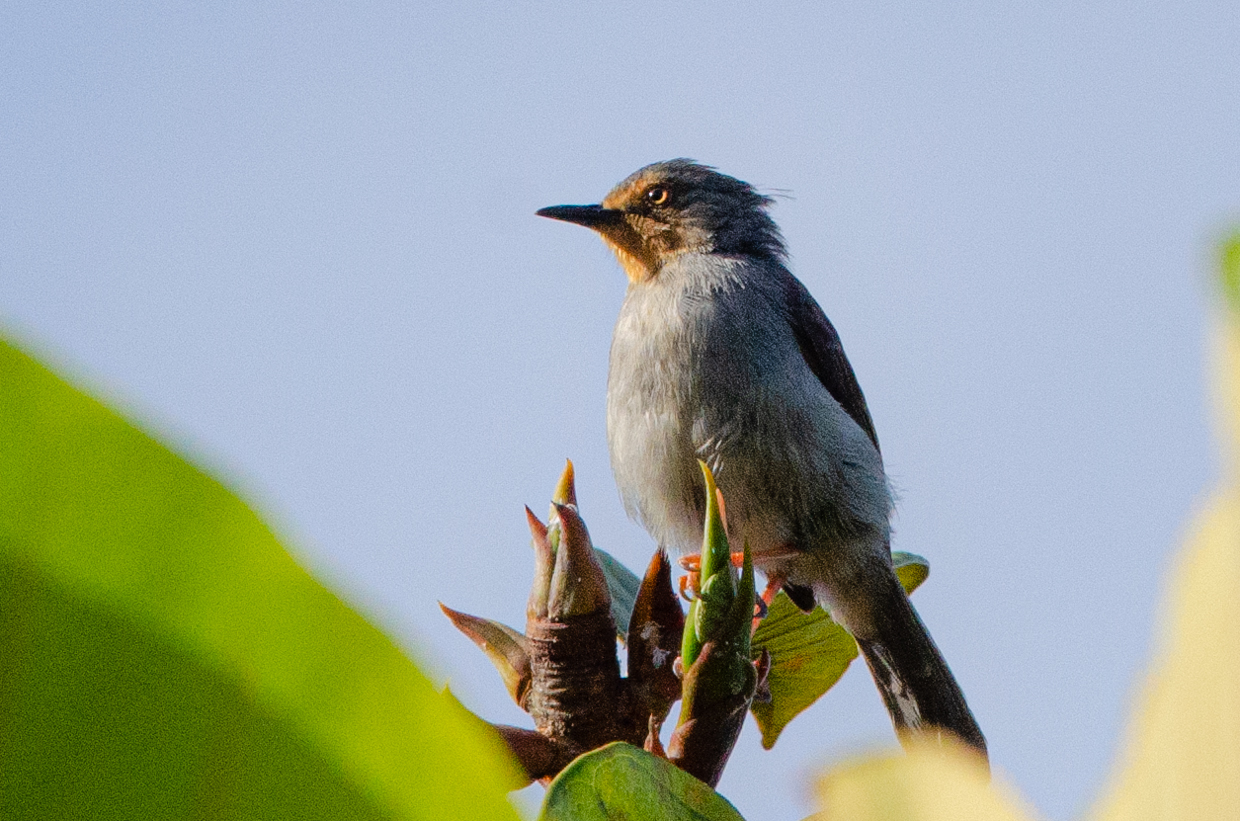
- A. bamendae in Noun, Cameroon

Conservation status
- Least Concern (IUCN 3.1)

Scientific classification
- Kingdom: Animalia
- Phylum: Chordata
- Class: Aves
- Order: Passeriformes
- Family: Cisticolidae
- Genus: Apalis
- Species: A. bamendae

Binomial name
- Apalis bamendae Bannerman, 1922
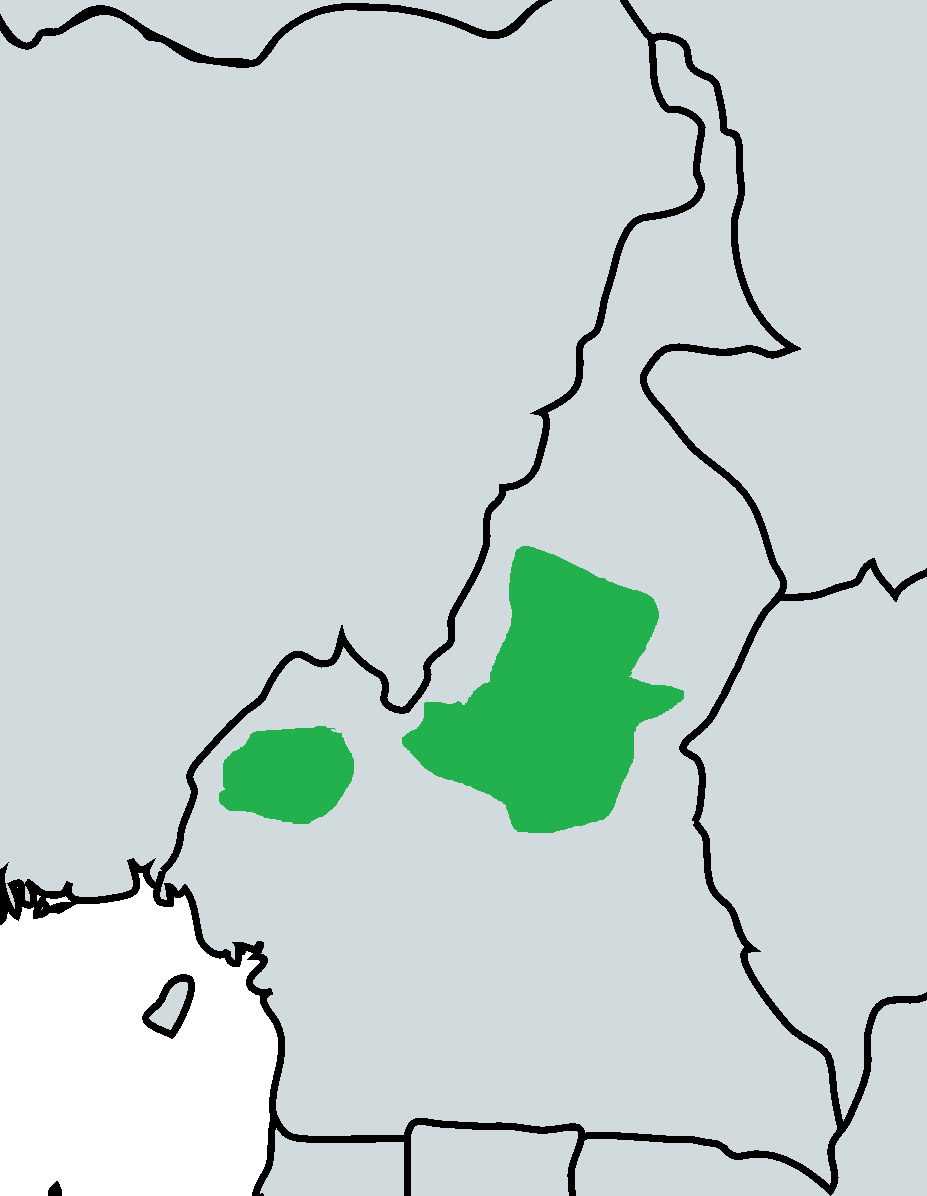

= Bamenda apalis =

Species of bird

The Bamenda apalis (Apalis bamendae) is a species of bird in the family Cisticolidae. It is endemic to Cameroon.

Its natural habitats are subtropical or tropical moist lowland forest and dry savanna. It is threatened by habitat loss.
