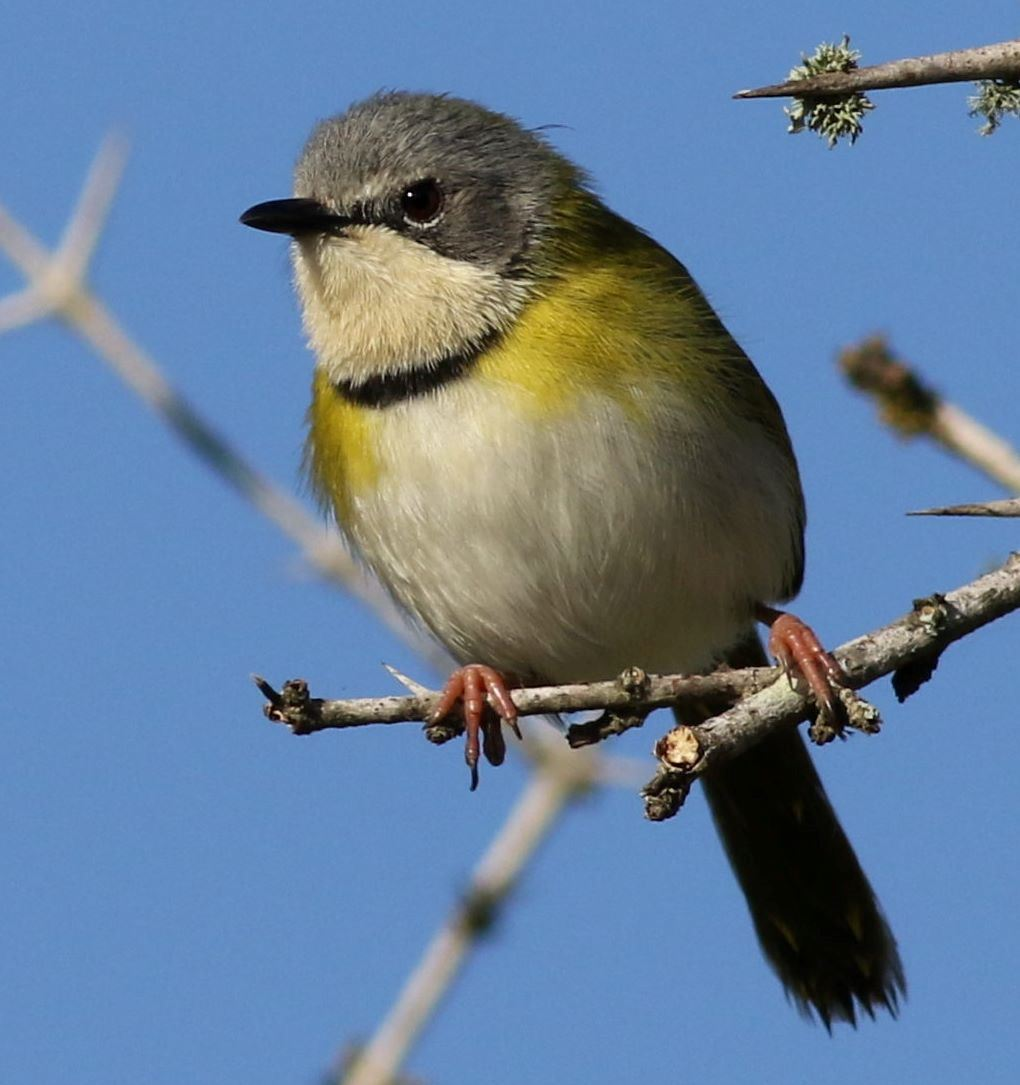
- At Ndumo Game Reserve, KwaZulu-Natal, South Africa

Conservation status
- Least Concern (IUCN 3.1)

Scientific classification
- Kingdom: Animalia
- Phylum: Chordata
- Class: Aves
- Order: Passeriformes
- Family: Cisticolidae
- Genus: Apalis
- Species: A. ruddi

Binomial name
- Apalis ruddi C. H. B. Grant, 1908

= Rudd's apalis =

Species of bird

Rudd's apalis (Apalis ruddi) is a species of bird in the family Cisticolidae. It is found primarily in Mozambique but also in southern Malawi and adjacent areas of South Africa and Eswatini. Its natural habitats are subtropical or tropical dry forest and subtropical or tropical moist shrubland.
