= Namuli apalis =

Conservation status
- Endangered (IUCN 3.1)

Scientific classification
- Kingdom: Animalia
- Phylum: Chordata
- Class: Aves
- Order: Passeriformes
- Family: Cisticolidae
- Genus: Apalis
- Species: A. lynesi

Binomial name
- Apalis lynesi Vincent, 1933

Synonyms
- Apalis thoracica lynesi

Species of bird

The Namuli apalis (Apalis lynesi) is a small African passerine bird belonging to the genus Apalis in the family Cisticolidae. It was formerly considered as a subspecies of the bar-throated apalis.

It is the only bird species endemic to Mozambique and is found only in the Mount Namuli massif in the north of the country where it was first discovered in 1932 by the English-born ornithologist Jack Vincent. There were no more records until an expedition rediscovered it in 1998. The bird is now known to be common in forest, forest edge and woodland patches above 1200 m. Logging of the forest is a potential threat but it appears to survive well in degraded and fragmented habitat.

It has a grey crown and nape and black throat and breast. The rest of the underparts are yellow and the upperparts are green. The outer tail-feathers are white. The bird is 11 to 12 cm (4.3 to 4.7 in) long. The male and female have different calls and duet with the female responding to the male's call.

It feeds mainly on insects and other small invertebrates but also eats some seeds and berries. It forages in pairs or small groups, often feeding on the ground or making short flights into the air.

The nest is a dome of moss built at least one metre above the ground.
