= Simon Steward =

Simon Steward may refer to:

- Simon Steward (judge) (born 1969), Australian judge
- Simon Steward (MP) (1575–1632), British politician
