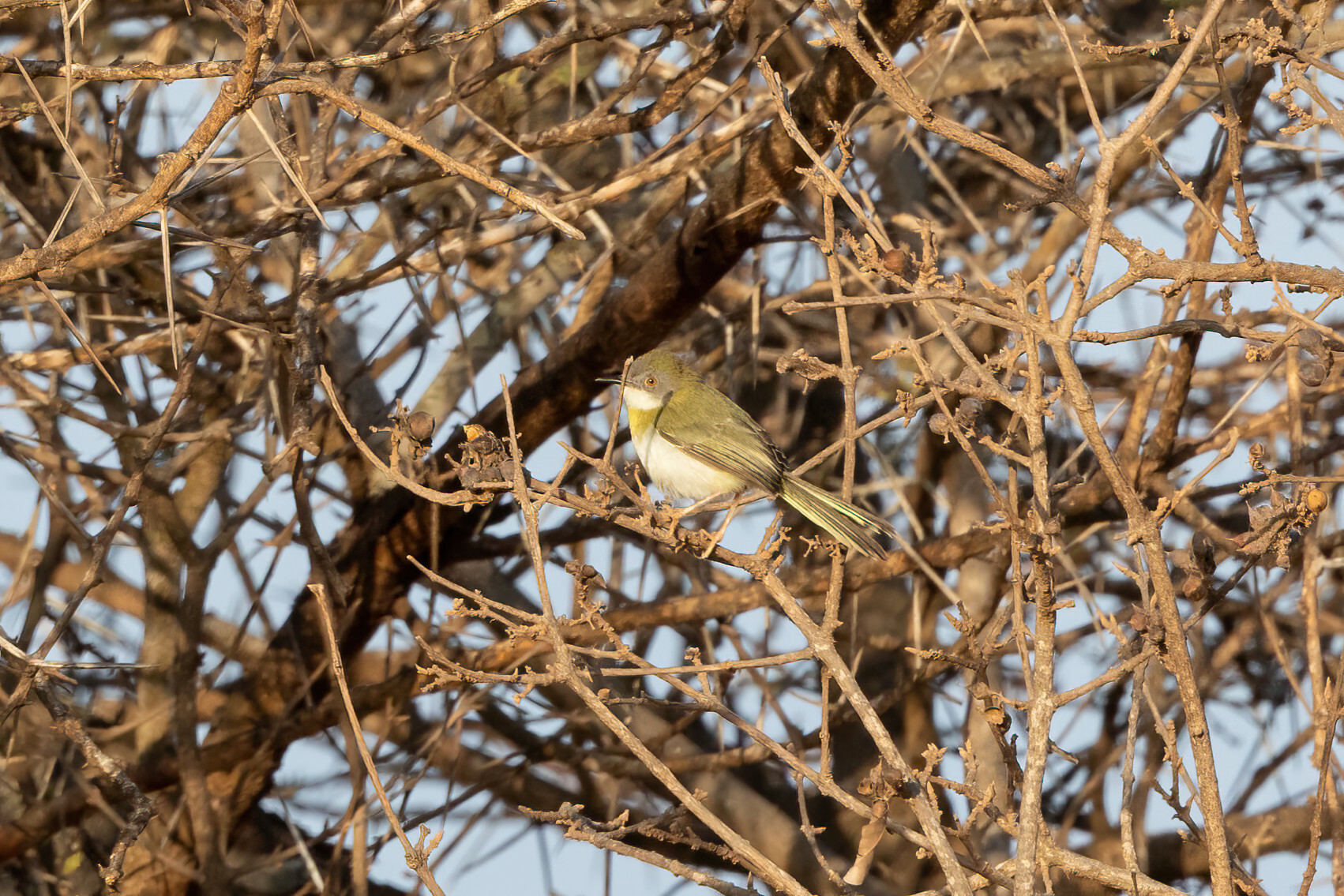

Conservation status
- Least Concern (IUCN 3.1)

Scientific classification
- Kingdom: Animalia
- Phylum: Chordata
- Class: Aves
- Order: Passeriformes
- Family: Cisticolidae
- Genus: Apalis
- Species: A. flavocincta

Binomial name
- Apalis flavocincta (Sharpe, 1882)

= Brown-tailed apalis =

Species of bird

The brown-tailed apalis (Apalis flavocincta) is a species of bird in the family Cisticolidae.

== Taxonomy ==
The brown-tailed apalis was formally split from the yellow-breasted apalis as a distinct species by the IOC in 2021.

== Range ==
It is found in Ethiopia and Sudan, and Uganda to Somalia and Kenya.

== Habitat ==
Its natural habitats are subtropical or tropical dry forest, subtropical or tropical moist lowland forest, dry savanna, and moist savanna.
