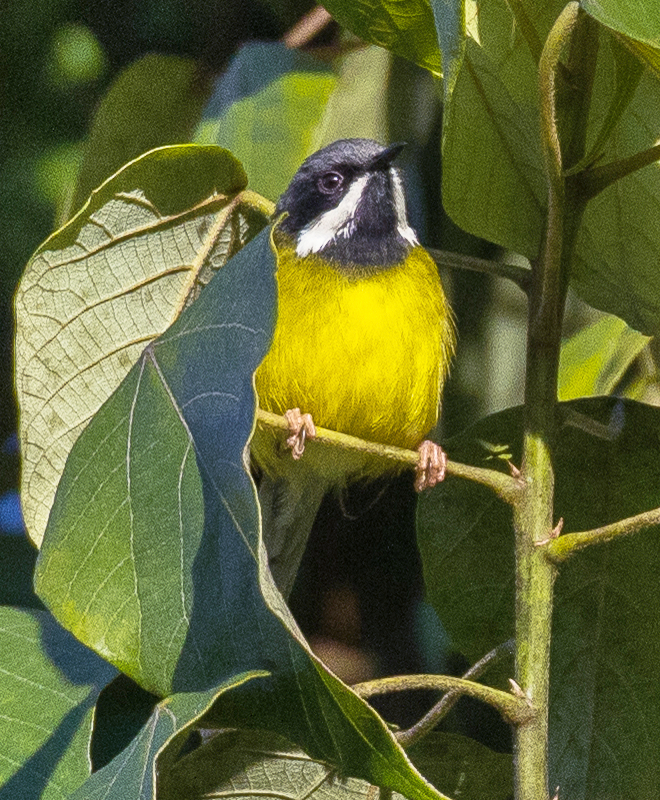
- A Black-throated Apalis photographed on Mt Kenya on 9 January 2020.

Conservation status
- Least Concern (IUCN 3.1)

Scientific classification
- Kingdom: Animalia
- Phylum: Chordata
- Class: Aves
- Order: Passeriformes
- Family: Cisticolidae
- Genus: Apalis
- Species: A. jacksoni

Binomial name
- Apalis jacksoni Sharpe, 1891

= Black-throated apalis =

Species of bird

The black-throated apalis (Apalis jacksoni) is a species of bird in the family Cisticolidae. It is native to the Western High Plateau, the Albertine Rift montane forests and the east African montane forests and isolated lowland areas of Cameroon, the DRC and Angola.
