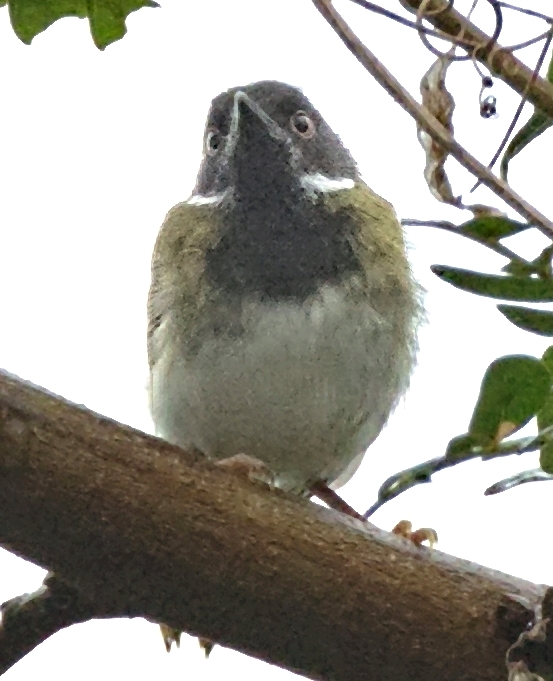
- A. binotata in northern Angola

Conservation status
- Least Concern (IUCN 3.1)

Scientific classification
- Kingdom: Animalia
- Phylum: Chordata
- Class: Aves
- Order: Passeriformes
- Family: Cisticolidae
- Genus: Apalis
- Species: A. binotata

Binomial name
- Apalis binotata Reichenow, 1895

= Lowland masked apalis =

Species of bird

The lowland masked apalis (Apalis binotata), also known as the masked apalis, is a species of bird in the family Cisticolidae. It is found in Angola, Cameroon, Democratic Republic of the Congo, Equatorial Guinea, Gabon, Tanzania, and Uganda. Its natural habitats are subtropical or tropical dry forest and subtropical or tropical moist lowland forest.

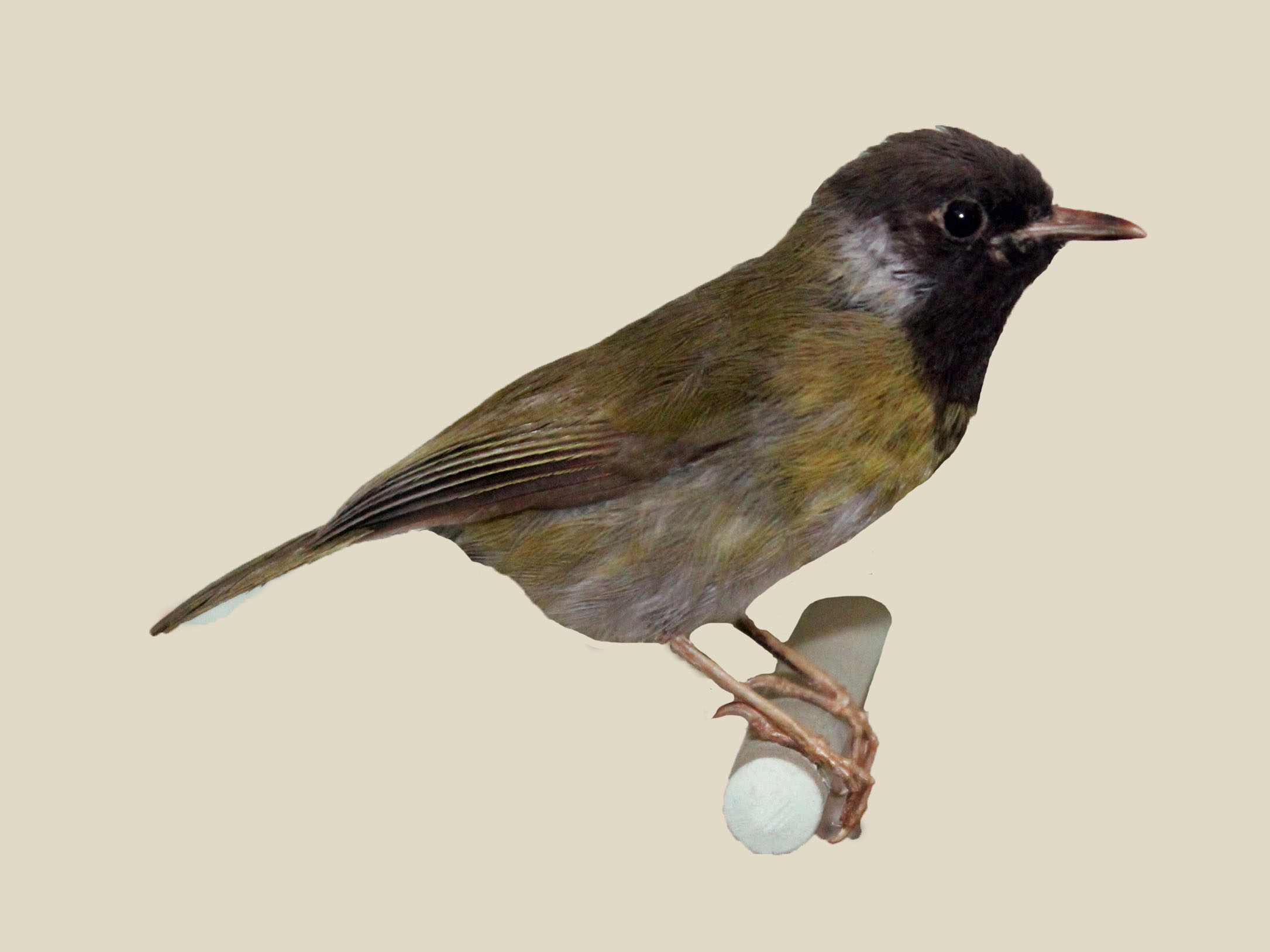
Specimen at Nairobi National Museum
