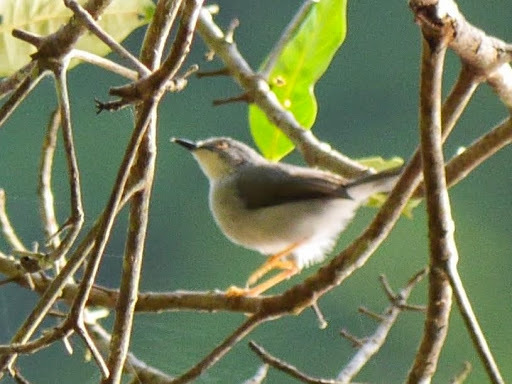

Conservation status
- Least Concern (IUCN 3.1)

Scientific classification
- Kingdom: Animalia
- Phylum: Chordata
- Class: Aves
- Order: Passeriformes
- Family: Cisticolidae
- Genus: Apalis
- Species: A. goslingi

Binomial name
- Apalis goslingi Alexander, 1908

= Gosling's apalis =

Species of bird

Gosling's apalis (Apalis goslingi) is a species of bird in the family Cisticolidae. It is found in Angola, Cameroon, Central African Republic, Republic of the Congo, Democratic Republic of the Congo, and Gabon. Its natural habitat is subtropical or tropical moist lowland forest.

The common name and Latin binomial commemorates the explorer Captain G. B. Gosling.
