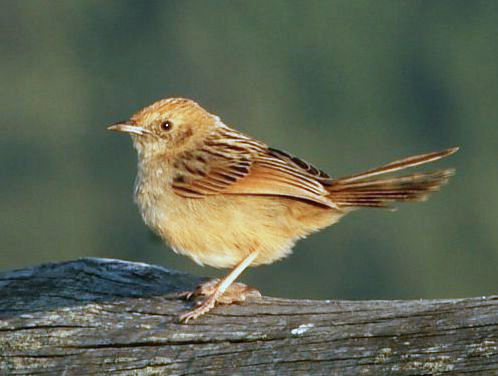
- In KwaZulu-Natal, South Africa

Conservation status
- Least Concern (IUCN 3.1)

Scientific classification
- Kingdom: Animalia
- Phylum: Chordata
- Class: Aves
- Order: Passeriformes
- Family: Cisticolidae
- Genus: Cisticola
- Species: C. lais

Binomial name
- Cisticola lais (Hartlaub & Finsch, 1870)

Audio
- Song recorded in Royal Natal National Park, South Africa

= Wailing cisticola =

Species of bird

The wailing cisticola (Cisticola lais) is a species of bird in the family Cisticolidae. It is found in Angola, Eswatini, Lesotho, Malawi, Mozambique, South Africa, Tanzania, Zambia, and Zimbabwe. Its natural habitat is subtropical or tropical high-altitude grassland.

Lynes's cisticola of Uganda, Kenya and northern Tanzania is sometimes regarded as a subspecies of this species.

The appearance of their eggs varies widely; they can be white, pale blue, spotted, or streaked.
