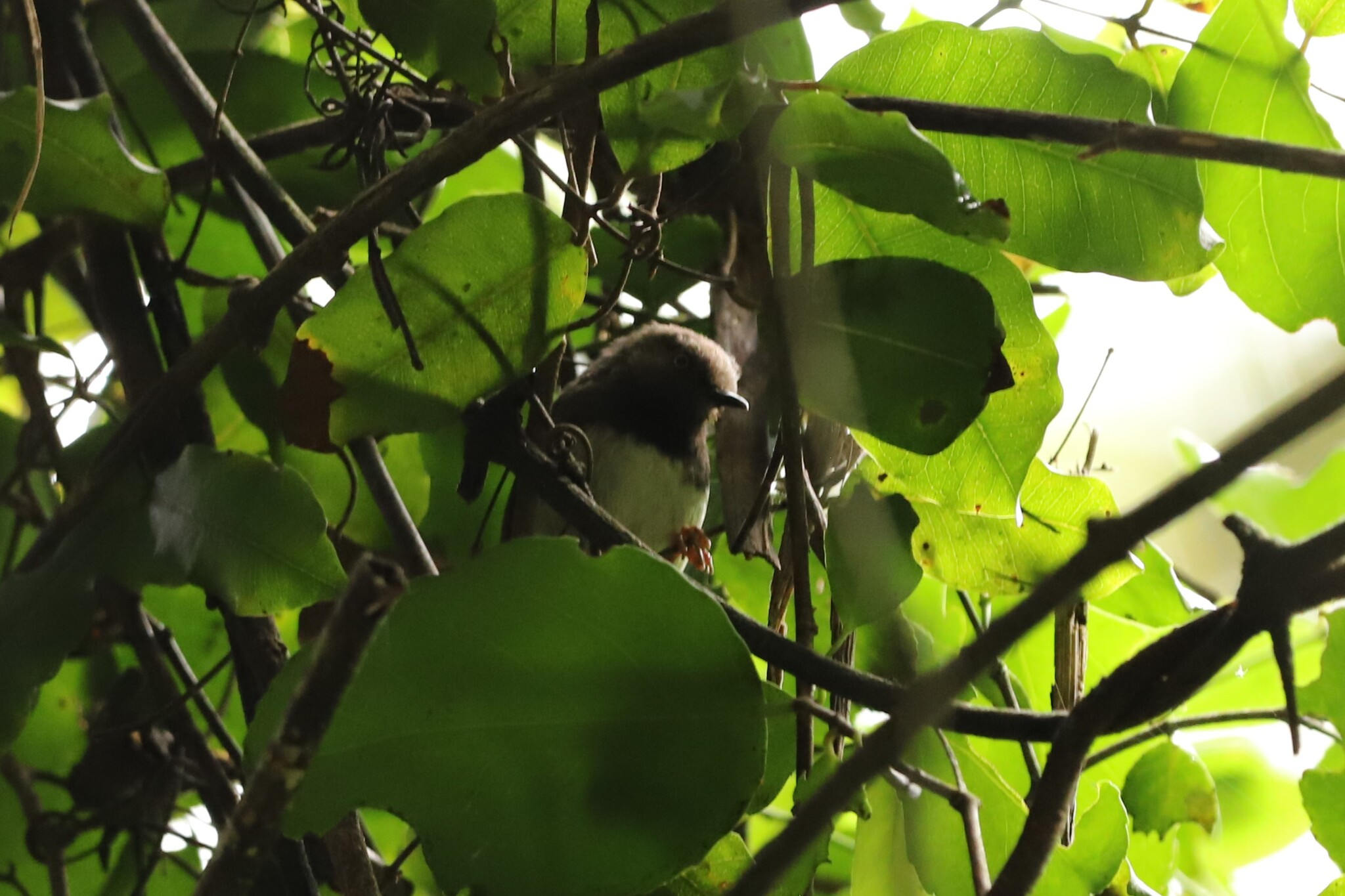

Conservation status
- Critically Endangered (IUCN 3.1)

Scientific classification
- Kingdom: Animalia
- Phylum: Chordata
- Class: Aves
- Order: Passeriformes
- Family: Cisticolidae
- Genus: Apalis
- Species: A. fuscigularis

Binomial name
- Apalis fuscigularis Moreau, 1938
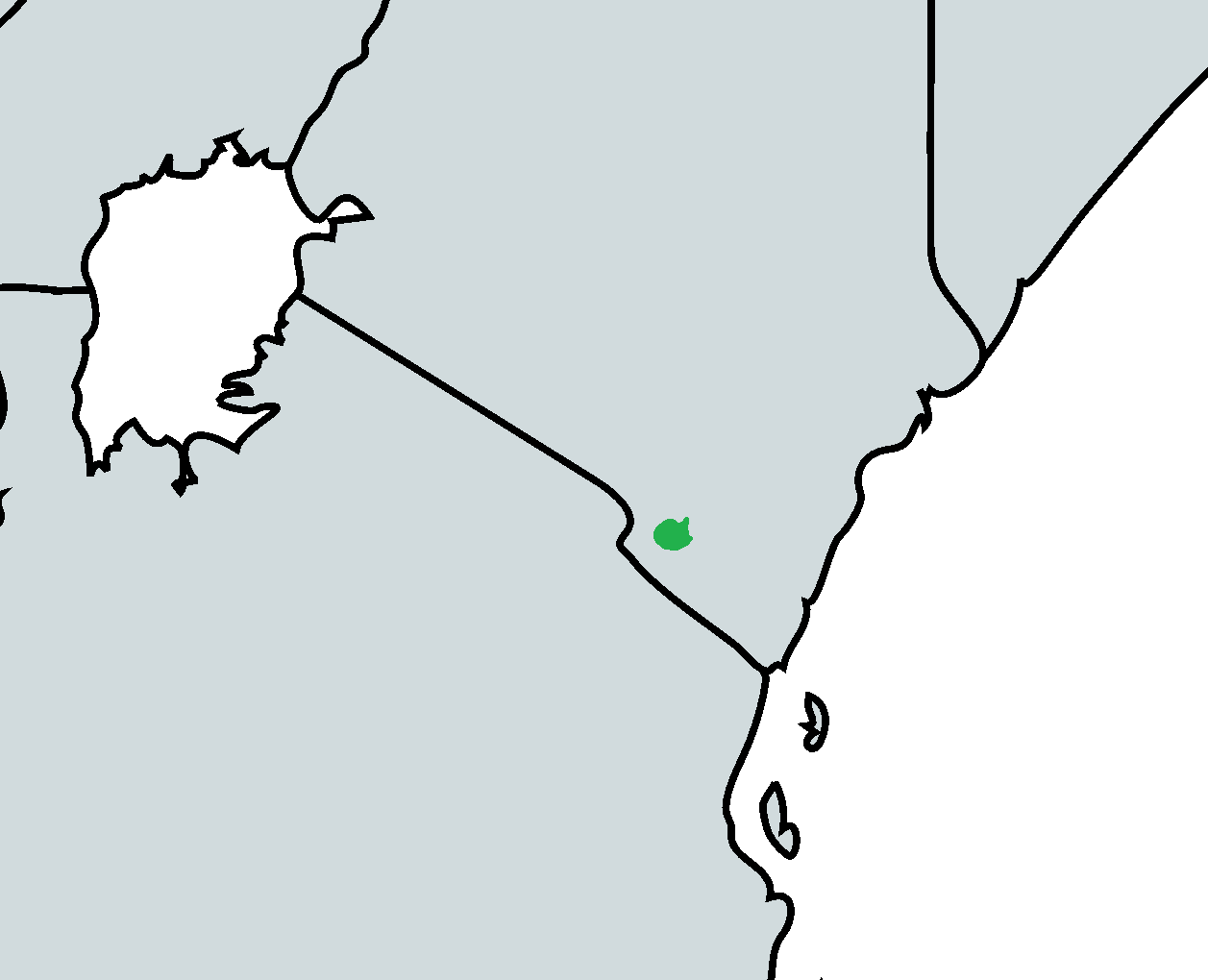

Synonyms
- Apalis thoracica fuscigularis

= Taita apalis =

Species of bird

The Taita apalis (Apalis fuscigularis) is a bird in the family Cisticolidae that is endemic to the Taita Hills in Kenya. It was formerly considered to be a subspecies of the bar-throated apalis.

Its natural habitat is subtropical or tropical moist montane forest. It is threatened by habitat loss. It is one of the rarest birds in the world. The population is currently estimated at 300–650 mature individuals though a survey in 2009–2010 suggests the species has suffered a severe population decline in extent of its habitat and its population may now be as low as 60–130 individuals. Most of the original forest has been cultivated or reforested with non-native timbers. Though little is known about this population crash as illegal logging and disturbance in the taita hills have been significantly reduced. However a serious drought in 2009 may have been a factor. The International Union for Conservation of Nature considers this species to be critically endangered due to its tiny occupied range of 1.5 km^{2} (0.58 sq mi) which is severely fragmented.

This is a medium–sized arboreal warbler at 14–16 cm (5.5–6.3 in) long and 10–12 g (0.35–0.42 oz) in weight with dark grey upperparts slightly darker shade on wings and tail. The throat and breast is black and the underparts are white to off-white. The eye is silvery white. Call is a repeated pillipp, pillippp similar to that of the bar–throated apalis while the song of the male is a loud chwee, chwee or chewk, chewk, chewk, with which the female may duet, giving a high pitched song cheek.
