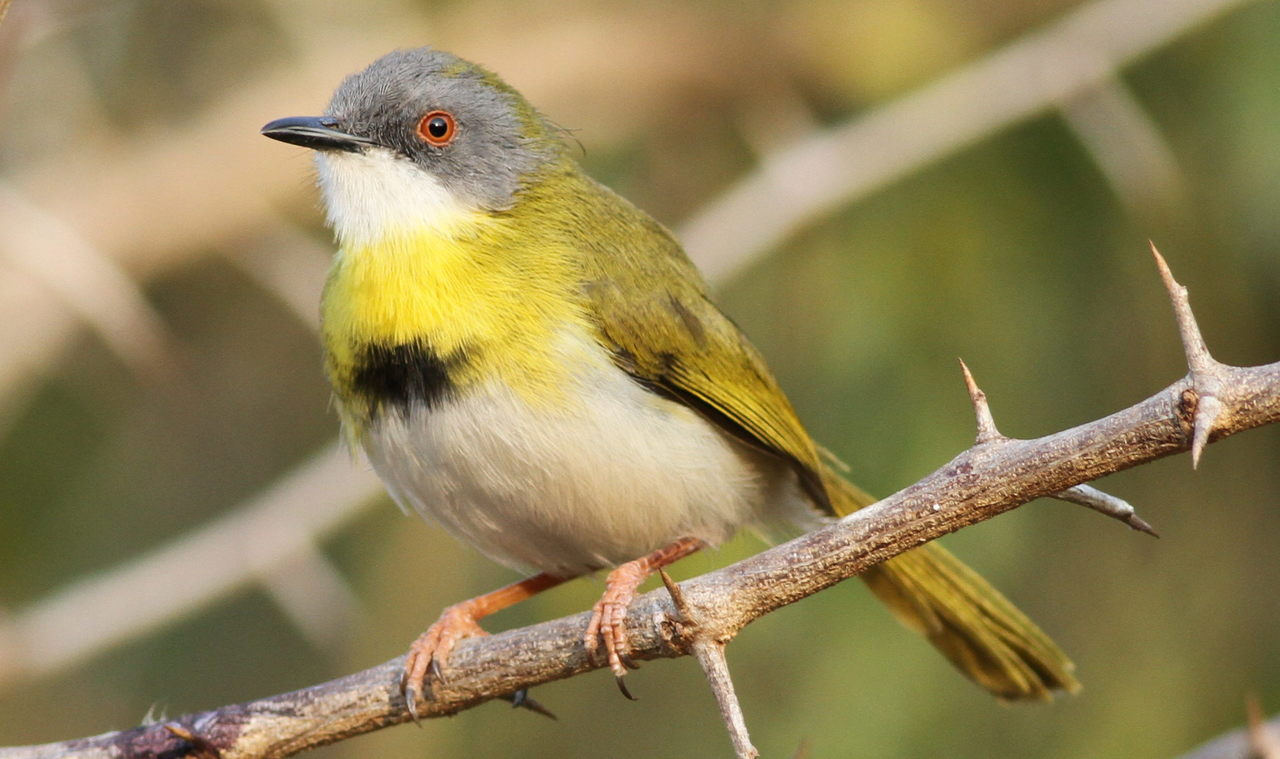
- A. f. subsp. neglecta, male
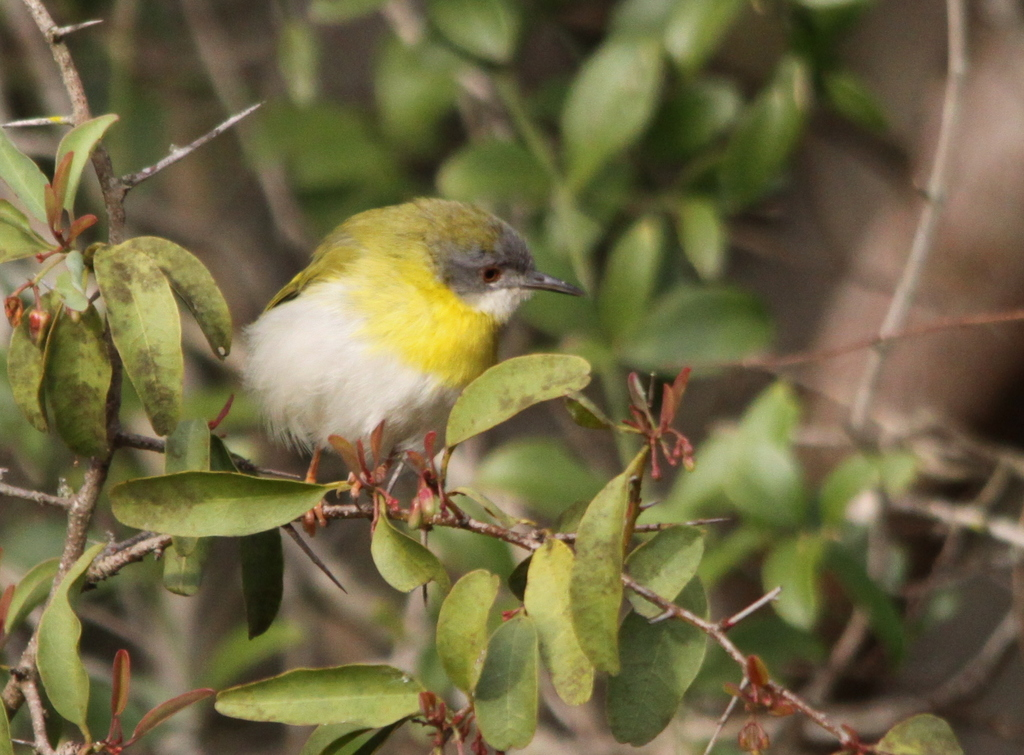
- A. f. subsp. neglecta, female

Conservation status
- Least Concern (IUCN 3.1)

Scientific classification
- Kingdom: Animalia
- Phylum: Chordata
- Class: Aves
- Order: Passeriformes
- Family: Cisticolidae
- Genus: Apalis
- Species: A. flavida

Binomial name
- Apalis flavida (Strickland, 1853)

= Yellow-breasted apalis =

Species of bird

The yellow-breasted apalis (Apalis flavida) is a species of bird in the family Cisticolidae.

== Taxonomy ==
The brown-tailed apalis (A. flavocincta) was formerly considered conspecific, but was split as a distinct species by the IOC in 2021.

== Range ==
It is widespread across Sub-Saharan Africa.

== Habitat ==
Its natural habitats are subtropical or tropical dry forest, subtropical or tropical moist lowland forest, dry savanna, and moist savanna.
