= Kabobo apalis =

Conservation status
- Vulnerable (IUCN 3.1)

Scientific classification
- Kingdom: Animalia
- Phylum: Chordata
- Class: Aves
- Order: Passeriformes
- Family: Cisticolidae
- Genus: Apalis
- Species: A. kaboboensis

Binomial name
- Apalis kaboboensis Prigogine, 1955
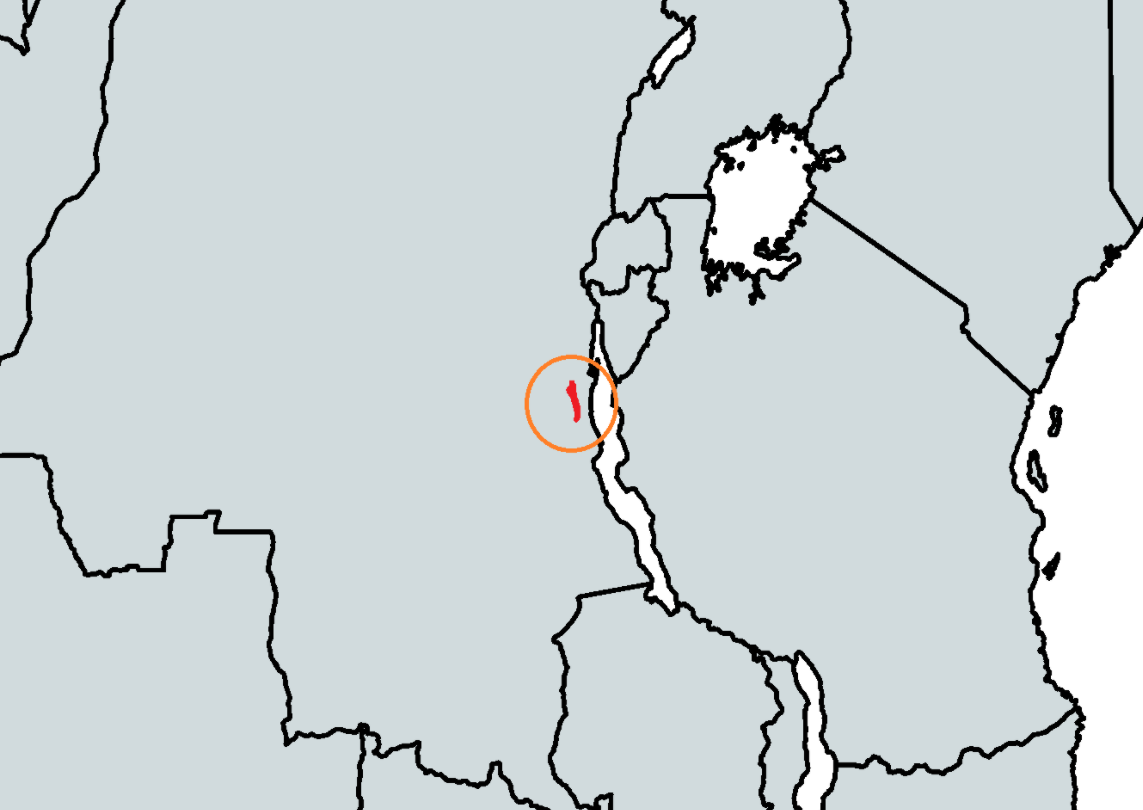

Synonyms
- Apalis porphyrolaema kaboboensis

Species of bird

The Kabobo apalis (Apalis kaboboensis) is a species of bird in the family Cisticolidae. It is endemic to the Kabobo Massif in eastern Democratic Republic of the Congo. Its natural habitat is tropical moist montane forests.

Originally described as a distinct species, it was later treated as a subspecies of the chestnut-throated apalis. It is now again treated as a separate species.

== Description ==
It is a small bird similar to the chestnut-throated apalis except that the throat is completely greyish in color. The male is blackish slate above, merging into the pale grey of the lower breast. The female is paler above, and the belly is whitish. The juvenile is suffused with olive throughout the body.

The voice is like the chestnut-throated apalis, a dry, buzzy trill.

== Distribution ==
This species is restricted to the Kabobo Massif in eastern Democratic Republic of the Congo.
