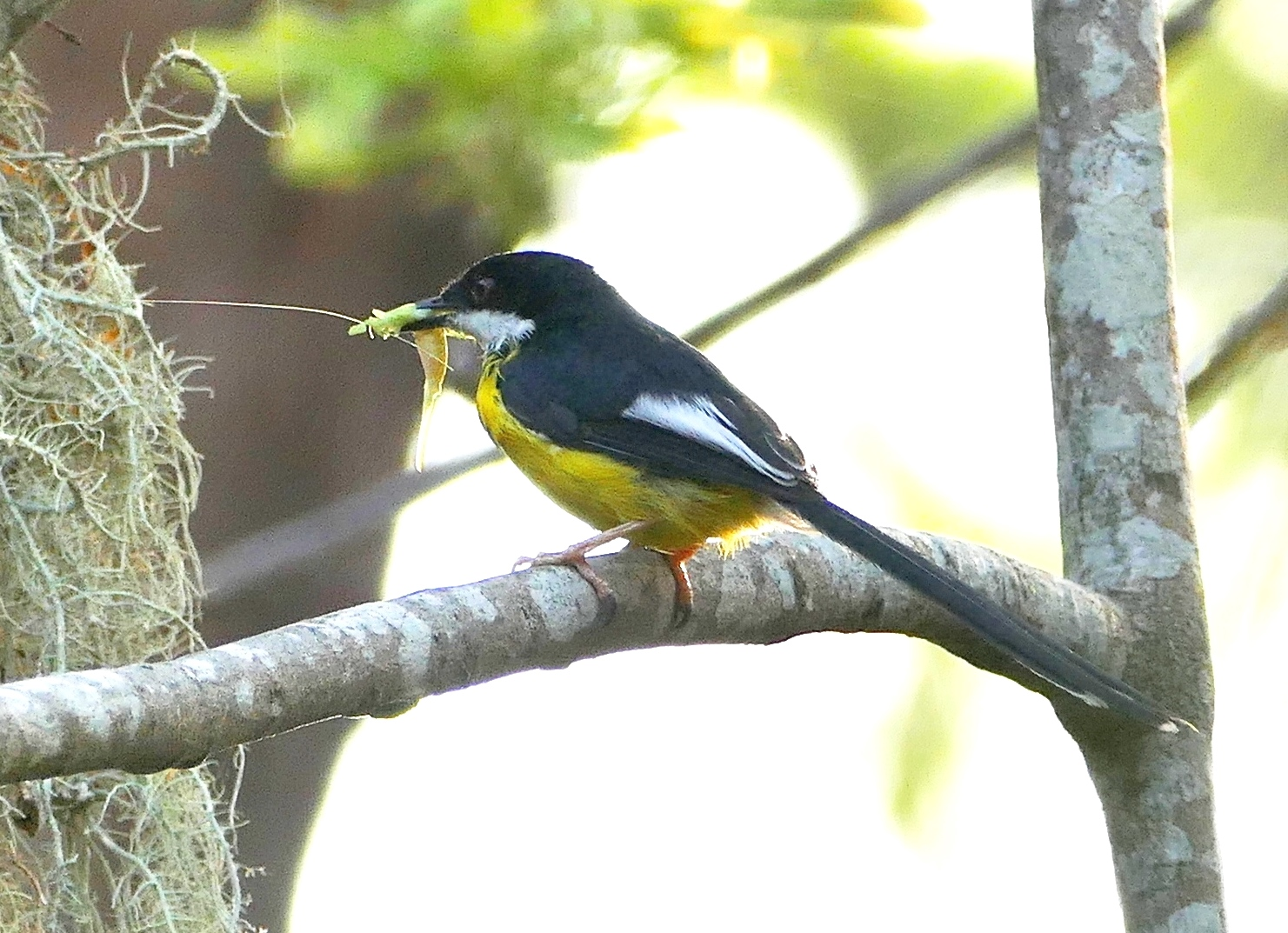
- In Malawi

Conservation status
- Near Threatened (IUCN 3.1)

Scientific classification
- Kingdom: Animalia
- Phylum: Chordata
- Class: Aves
- Order: Passeriformes
- Family: Cisticolidae
- Genus: Apalis
- Species: A. chariessa

Binomial name
- Apalis chariessa Reichenow, 1879

= White-winged apalis =

Species of bird

The white-winged apalis (Apalis chariessa) is a species of bird in the family Cisticolidae. It is found in Kenya, Malawi, Mozambique, and Tanzania. Its natural habitats are subtropical or tropical moist lowland forest and subtropical or tropical moist montane forest. It is threatened by habitat loss.
