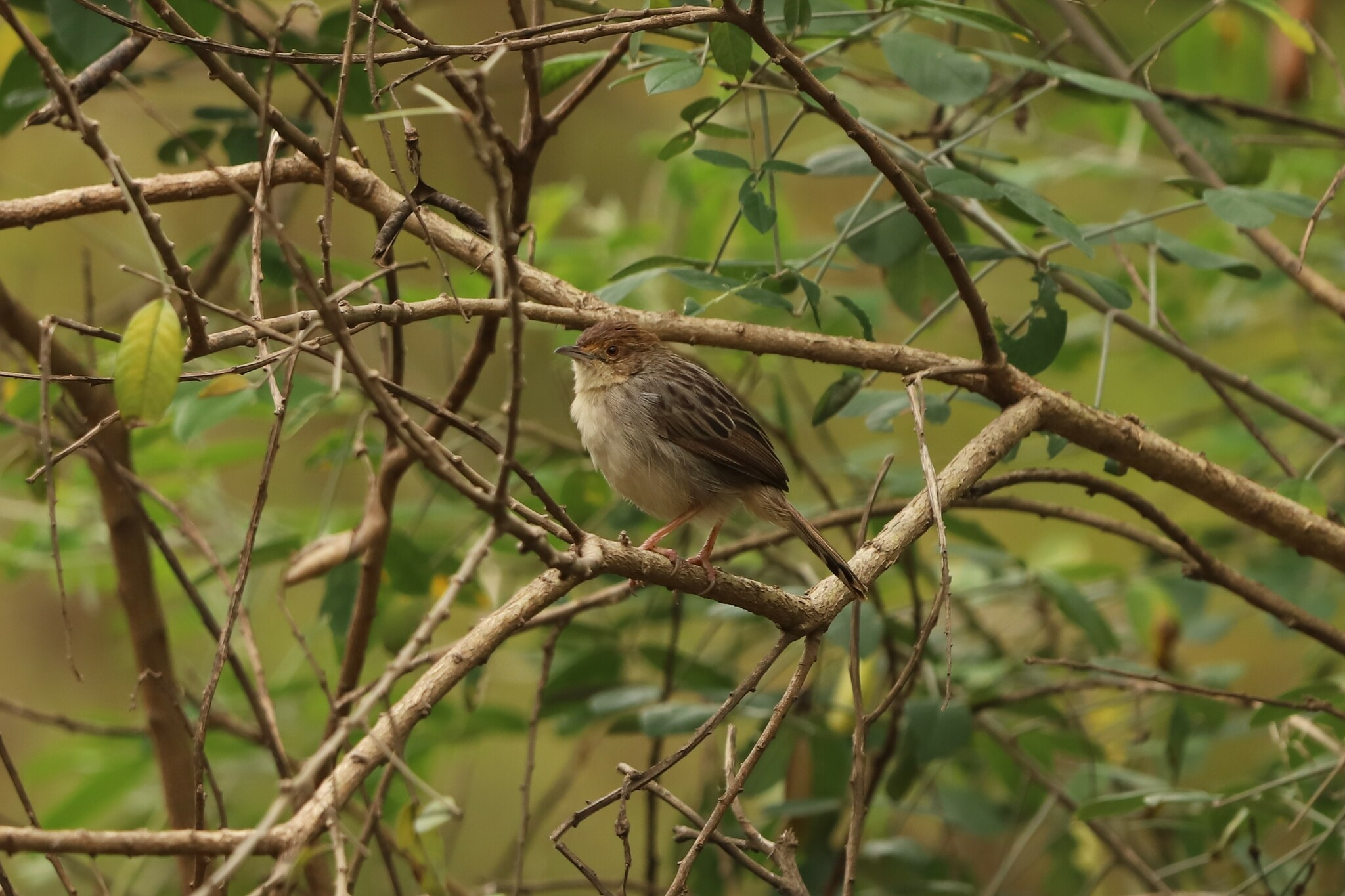

Scientific classification
- Kingdom: Animalia
- Phylum: Chordata
- Class: Aves
- Order: Passeriformes
- Family: Cisticolidae
- Genus: Cisticola
- Species: C. distinctus

Binomial name
- Cisticola distinctus Lynes, 1930

Synonyms
- Collocalia lais distinctus

= Lynes's cisticola =

Species of bird

Lynes's cisticola (Cisticola distinctus) is a species of bird in the family Cisticolidae. It is found in Uganda and Kenya. Its natural habitat is subtropical or tropical high-altitude grassland.

Lynes's cisticola is sometimes considered as a subspecies species of the wailing cisticola (Cisticola lais). The vernacular name commemorates the amateur ornithologist Rear Admiral Hubert Lynes.
