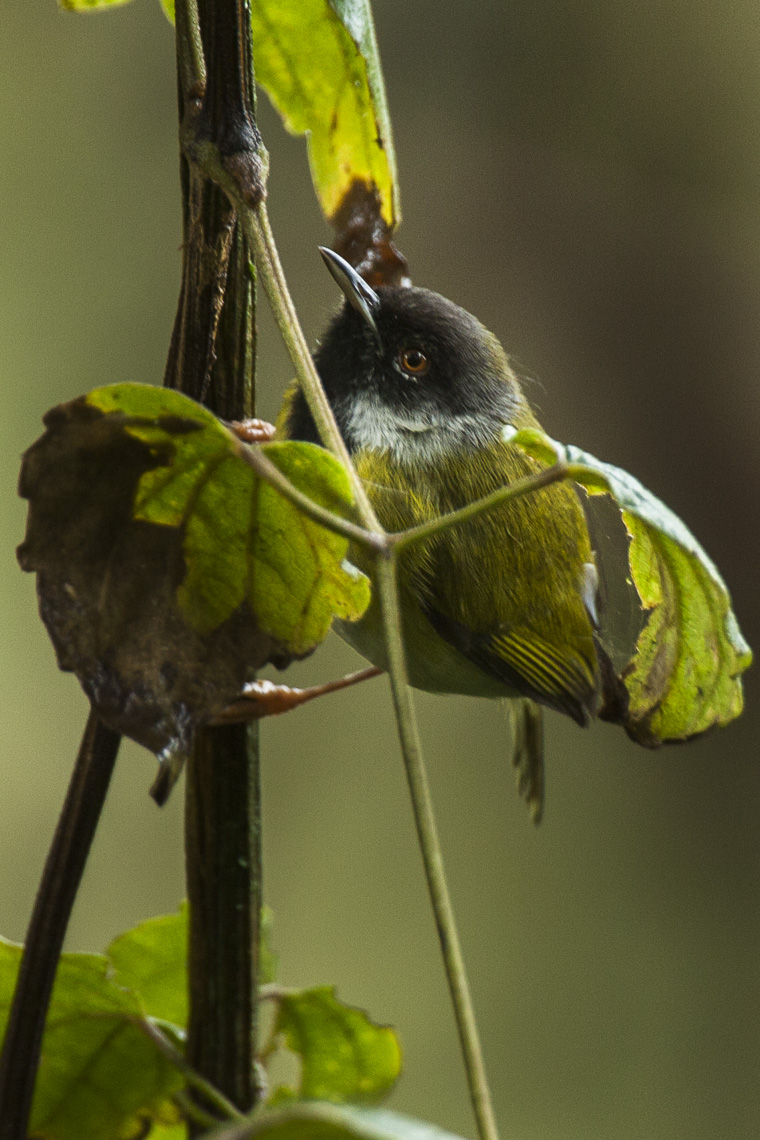
- In Uganda

Conservation status
- Least Concern (IUCN 3.1)

Scientific classification
- Kingdom: Animalia
- Phylum: Chordata
- Class: Aves
- Order: Passeriformes
- Family: Cisticolidae
- Genus: Apalis
- Species: A. personata

Binomial name
- Apalis personata Sharpe, 1902

= Mountain masked apalis =

Species of bird

The mountain masked apalis (Apalis personata), also known as the black-faced apalis, is a species of bird in the family Cisticolidae. It is native to the Albertine Rift montane forests. It was first described in 1902.
