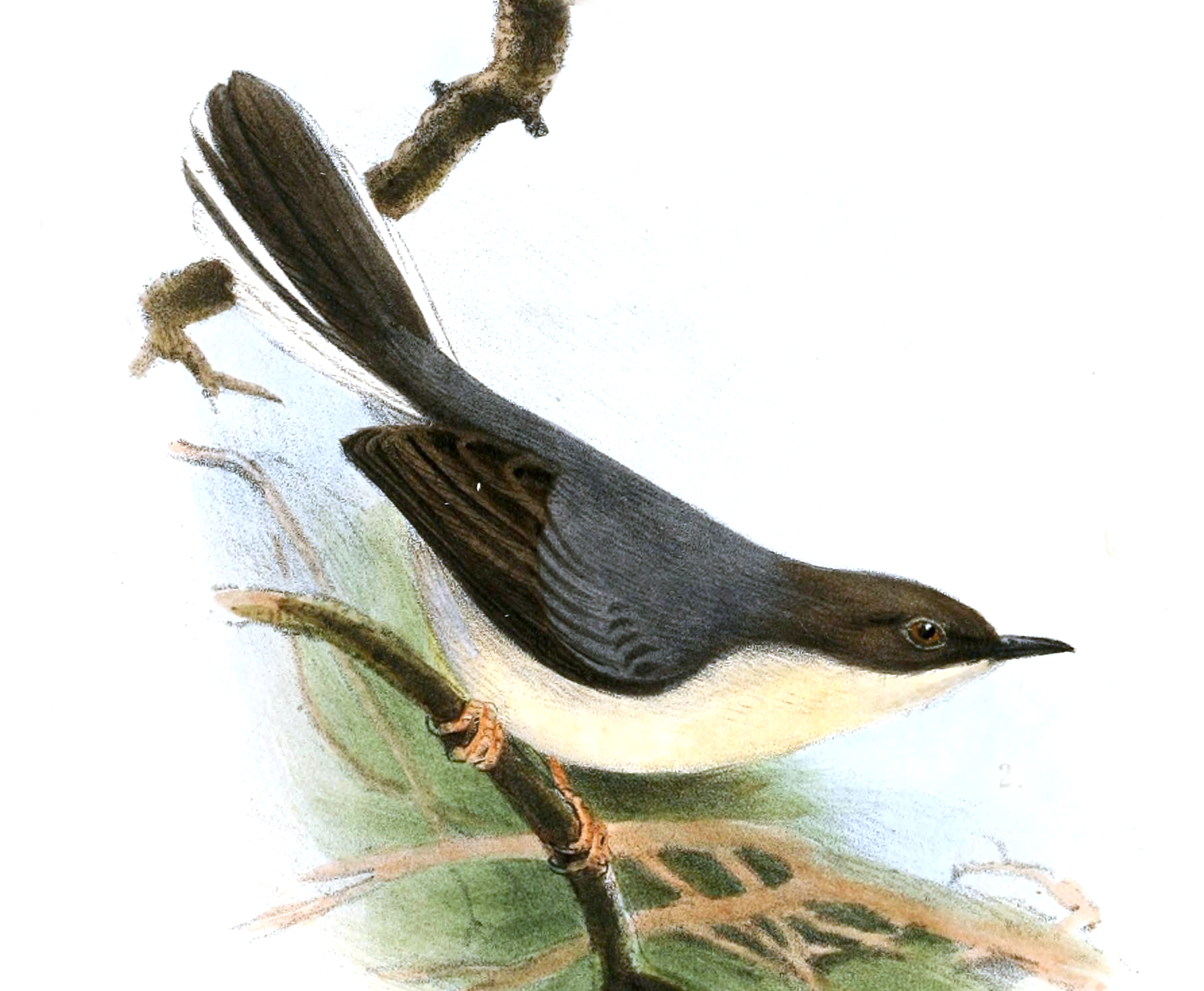
- Illustration by G. E. Lodge (1901)
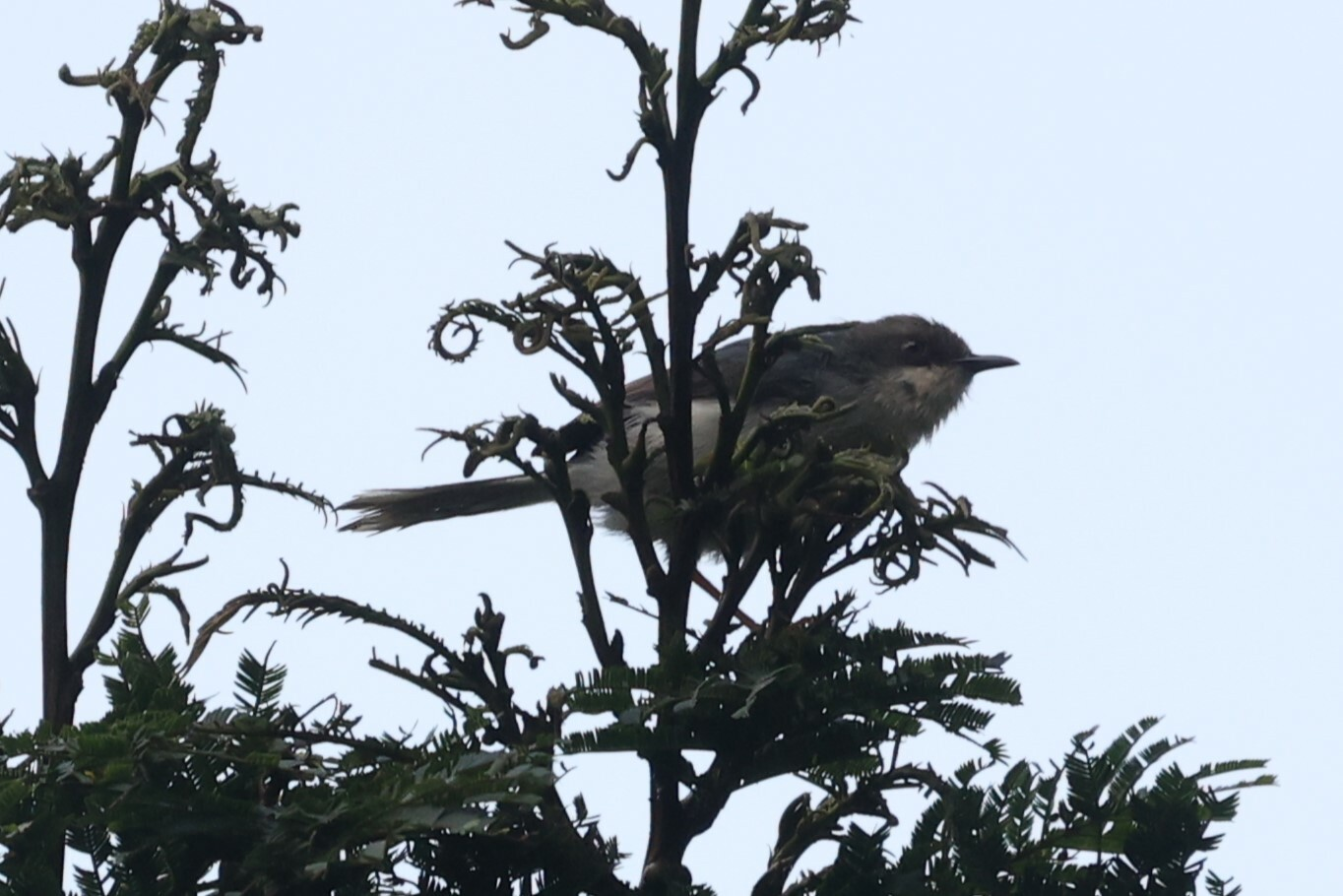

Conservation status
- Least Concern (IUCN 3.1)

Scientific classification
- Kingdom: Animalia
- Phylum: Chordata
- Class: Aves
- Order: Passeriformes
- Family: Cisticolidae
- Genus: Apalis
- Species: A. cinerea

Binomial name
- Apalis cinerea (Sharpe, 1891)

= Grey apalis =

Species of bird

The grey apalis (Apalis cinerea) is a species of bird in the family Cisticolidae.

It is found in Angola, Burundi, Cameroon, Democratic Republic of the Congo, Equatorial Guinea, Gabon, Kenya, Nigeria, Rwanda, South Sudan, Sudan, Tanzania, and Uganda. Its natural habitats are tropical dry forest and tropical moist montane forest.

== Vocalizations ==
They sing both at night and during the day.
