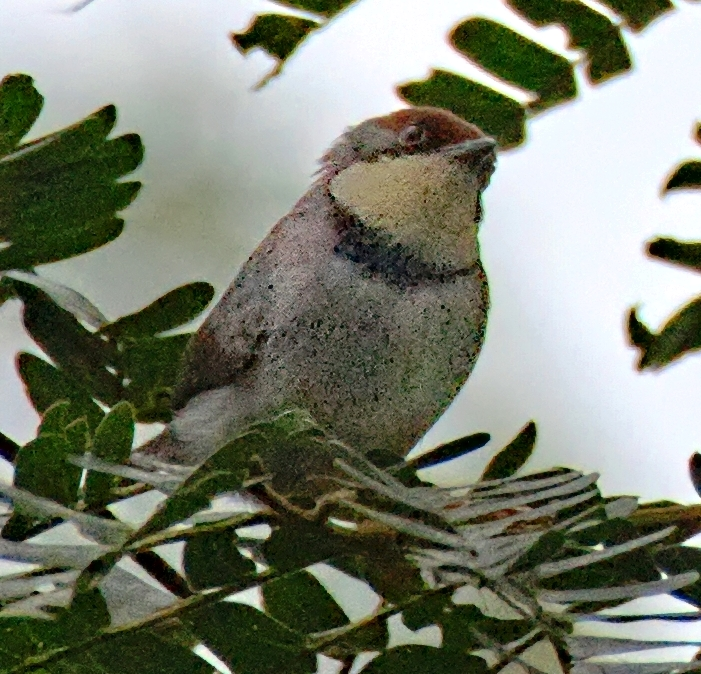

Conservation status
- Least Concern (IUCN 3.1)

Scientific classification
- Kingdom: Animalia
- Phylum: Chordata
- Class: Aves
- Order: Passeriformes
- Family: Cisticolidae
- Genus: Apalis
- Species: A. rufogularis

Binomial name
- Apalis rufogularis (Fraser, 1843)

= Buff-throated apalis =

Species of bird

The buff-throated apalis (Apalis rufogularis) is a species of bird in the family Cisticolidae. It is found in Angola, Benin, Burundi, Cameroon, Central African Republic, Republic of the Congo, Democratic Republic of the Congo, Equatorial Guinea, Gabon, Kenya, Nigeria, Rwanda, South Sudan, Tanzania, Uganda, and Zambia.
