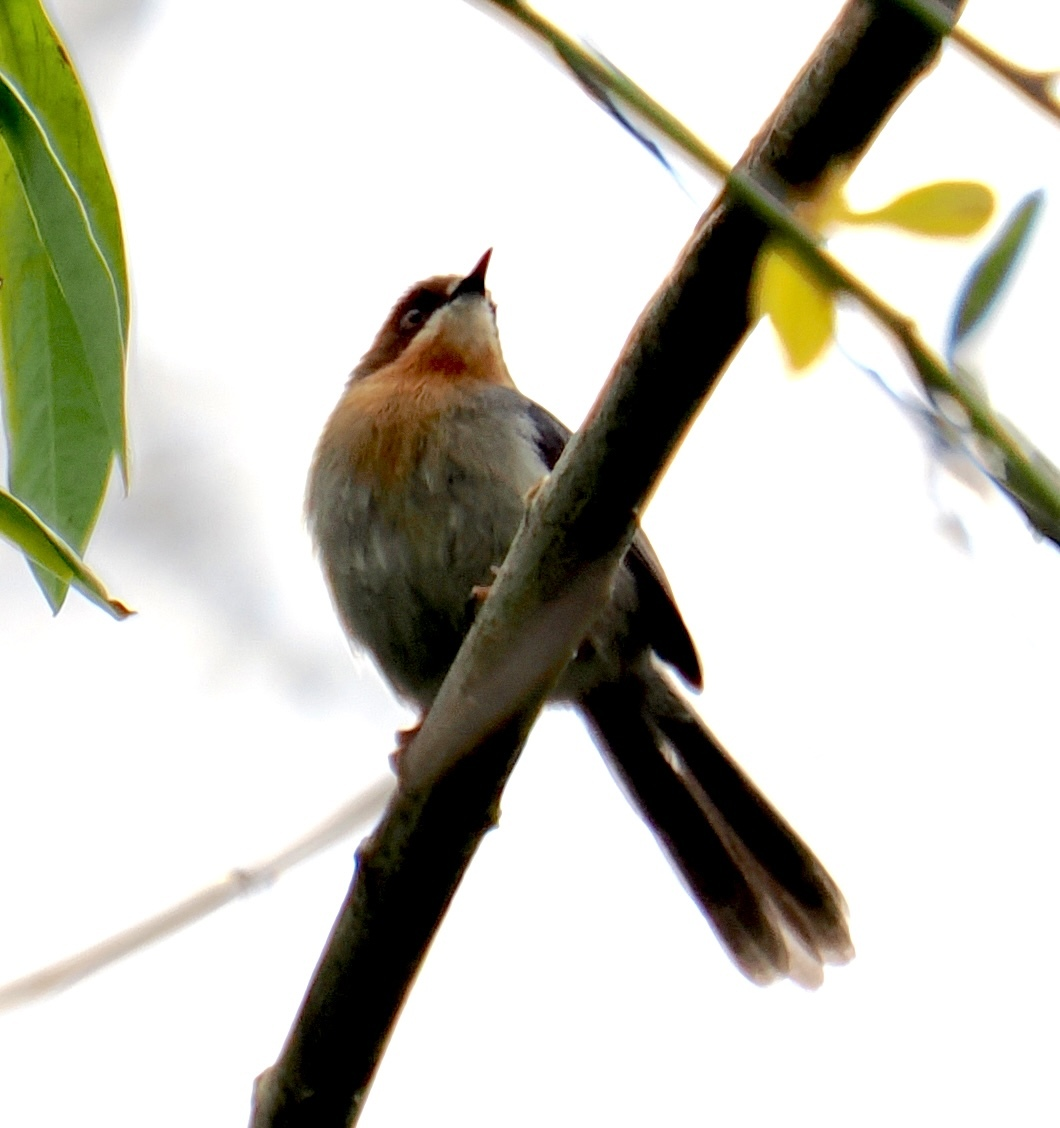

Conservation status
- Least Concern (IUCN 3.1)

Scientific classification
- Kingdom: Animalia
- Phylum: Chordata
- Class: Aves
- Order: Passeriformes
- Family: Cisticolidae
- Genus: Apalis
- Species: A. chapini

Binomial name
- Apalis chapini Friedmann, 1928
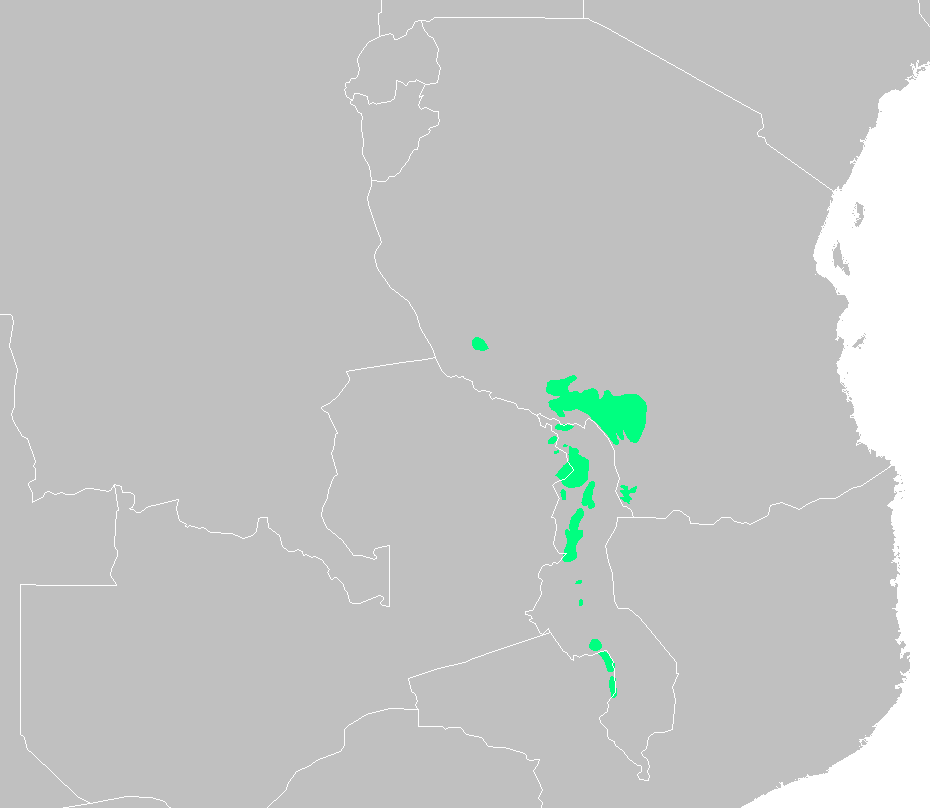
- General range: the Southern Rift montane forest-grassland mosaic

= Chapin's apalis =

Species of bird

Chapin's apalis (Apalis chapini) is a species of bird in the family Cisticolidae. It is found in Malawi, Tanzania, and Zambia. Its natural habitat is subtropical or tropical moist montane forest.

The common name and the Latin binomial commemorate the American ornithologist James Chapin.
