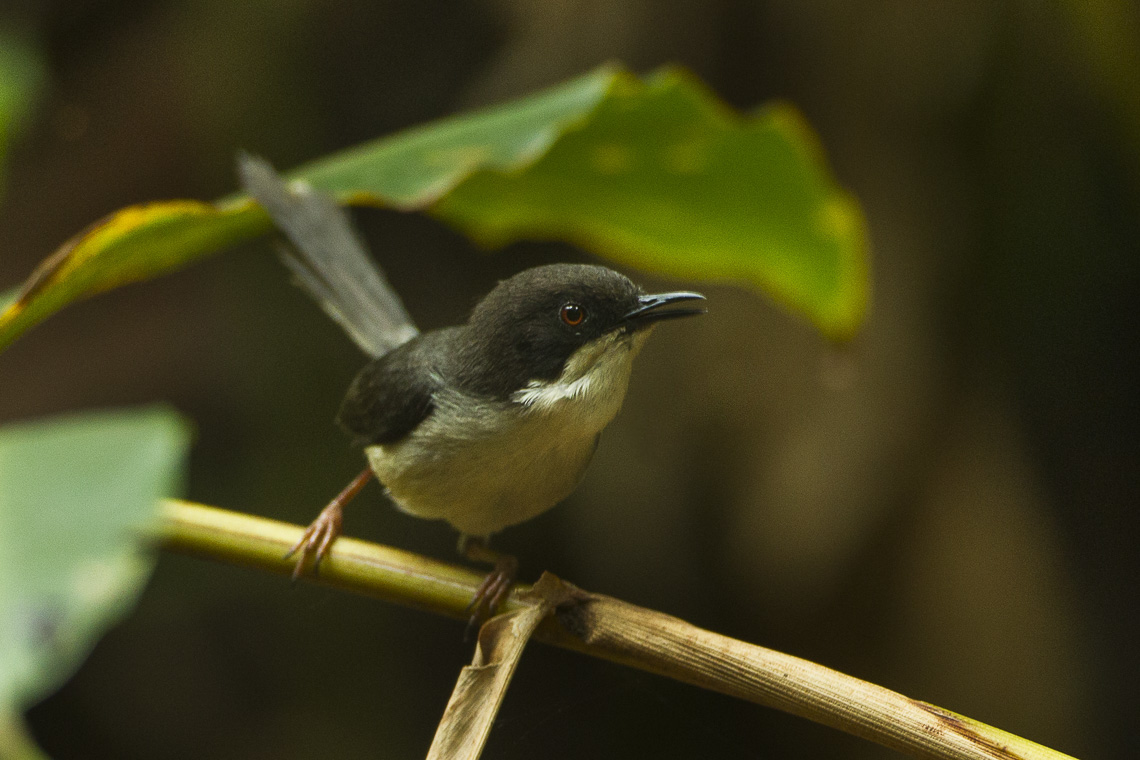
- In Malawi

Conservation status
- Least Concern (IUCN 3.1)

Scientific classification
- Kingdom: Animalia
- Phylum: Chordata
- Class: Aves
- Order: Passeriformes
- Family: Cisticolidae
- Genus: Apalis
- Species: A. melanocephala

Binomial name
- Apalis melanocephala (Fischer & Reichenow, 1884)

= Black-headed apalis =

Species of bird

The black-headed apalis (Apalis melanocephala) is a species of bird in the family Cisticolidae. It is found in Kenya, Malawi, Mozambique, Somalia, Tanzania, and Zimbabwe. Its natural habitats are subtropical or tropical dry forest, subtropical or tropical moist lowland forest, and subtropical or tropical moist montane forest.
