= Simon Stuart (conservationist) =

Simon Nicholas Stuart (born 14 July 1956) is a conservationist and past executive director of A Rocha International. He is particularly known for his work on the IUCN Red List of Threatened Species.

== Education ==
Stuart completed his undergraduate education at the University of Cambridge in applied biology. He remained there to complete a Doctor of Philosophy in biogeography of Tanzanian montane birds under the supervision of S.K. Eltringham, while also research associate at University of Dar es Salaam under the supervision of Kim Howell.

== Career ==
After completing his PhD, Stuart worked as a consultant for ICBP (now BirdLife International) before moving to IUCN where he spent over 30 years in roles including Head and Chair of the Species Survival Commission, and Acting Director General. In 2017 he became Director of Strategic Conservation at Synchronicity Earth remaining until 2021 when he moved to become executive director of A Rocha International.

He is a committed Christian and a past trustee of A Rocha International.

== Honours and awards ==
- Blue Planet Prize (2020)
