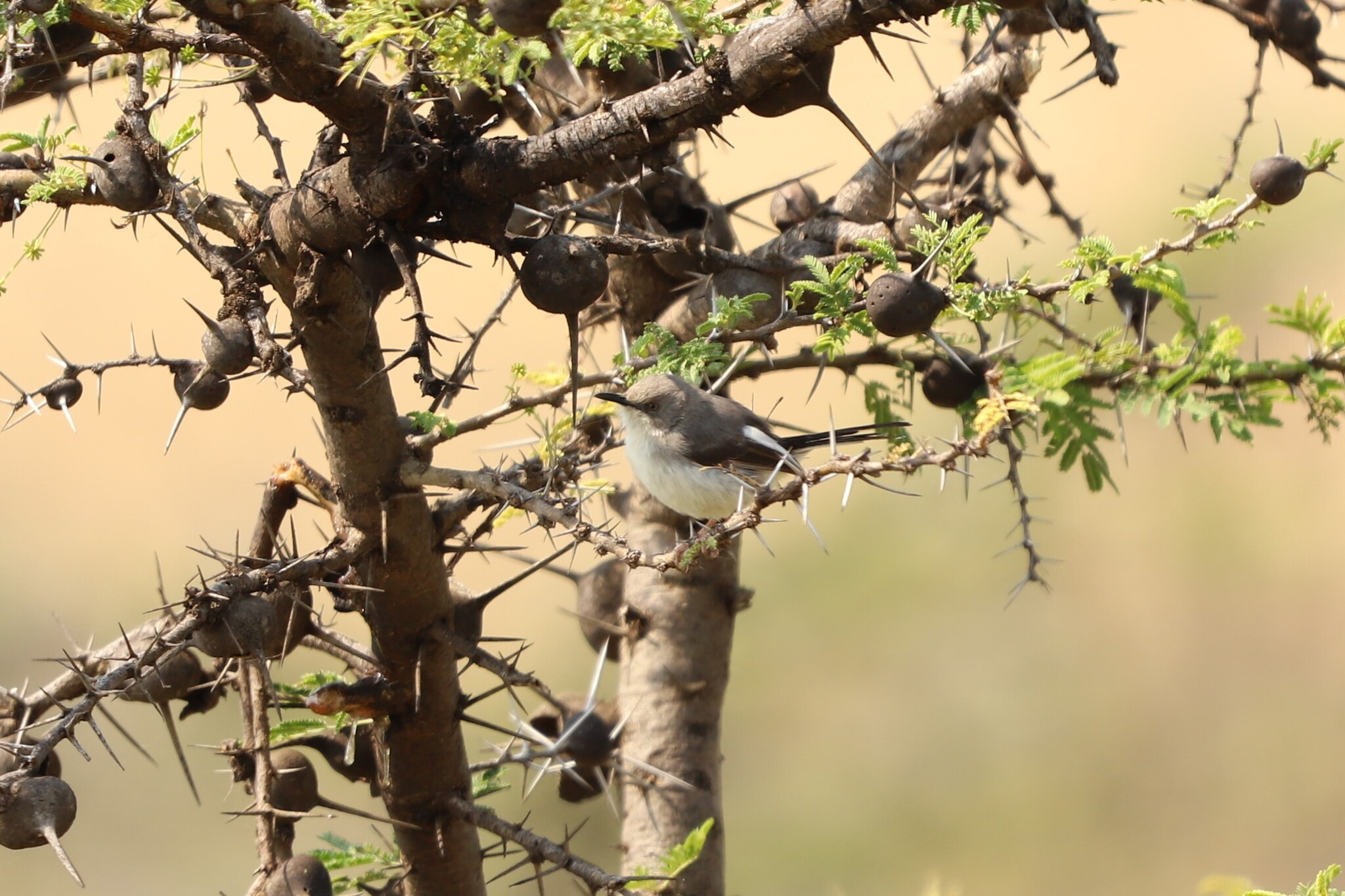

Conservation status
- Vulnerable (IUCN 3.1)

Scientific classification
- Kingdom: Animalia
- Phylum: Chordata
- Class: Aves
- Order: Passeriformes
- Family: Cisticolidae
- Genus: Apalis
- Species: A. karamojae

Binomial name
- Apalis karamojae (Van Someren, 1921)

= Karamoja apalis =

Species of bird

The Karamoja apalis (Apalis karamojae) is a species of bird in the family Cisticolidae. It is endemic to Uganda.

Its natural habitat is subtropical or tropical moist shrubland with a particular preference for stands of whistling thorn Acacia drepanolobium. It is threatened by habitat loss.
