= George Ernest Shelley =

English geologist and ornithologist

- Born: 15 May 1840; Avington, Hampshire
- Died: 29 November 1910 (aged 70); Bournemouth
- Education: Lycée de Versailles
- Known for: The Birds of Africa (5 volumes, 1896–1912)
- Relatives: Percy Bysshe Shelley (uncle)
- Scientific career
- Fields: Ornithology
- Institutions: Grenadier Guards
- Author abbrev. (zoology): Shelley

Captain George Ernest Shelley (15 May 1840 – 29 November 1910) was an English geologist and ornithologist. He was a nephew of the poet Percy Bysshe Shelley.

Shelley was educated at the Lycée de Versailles and served a few years in the Grenadier Guards.

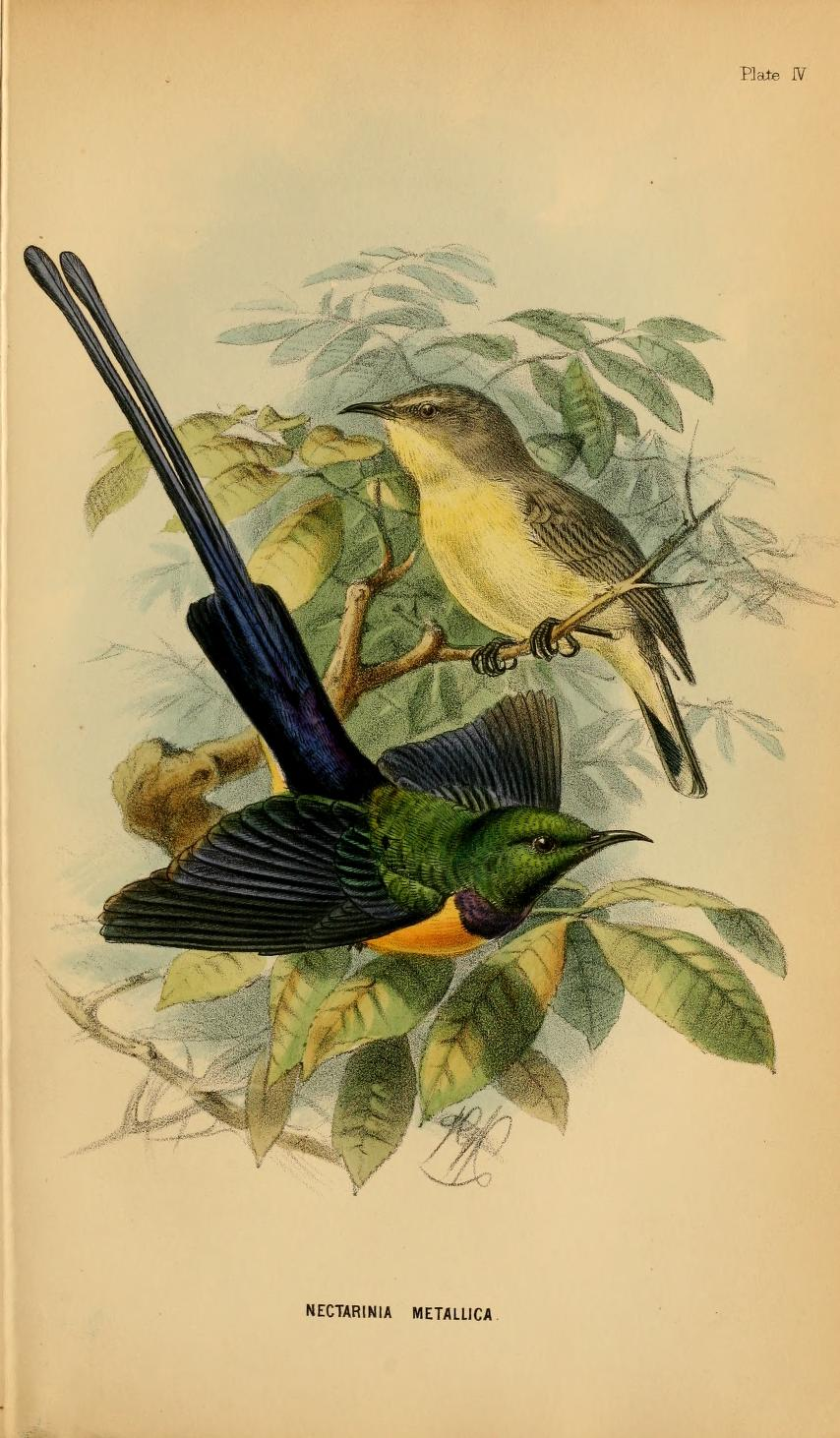
Illustration of the Nile Valley sunbird (Hedydipna metallica) from Shelley's book, A Handbook to the Birds of Egypt (1872)

His books included A Monograph of the Cinnyridae, or Family of Sun-Birds (1876–1880), A Handbook to the Birds of Egypt (1872) and The Birds of Africa (5 volumes, 1896–1912) illustrated by J. G. Keulemans.
