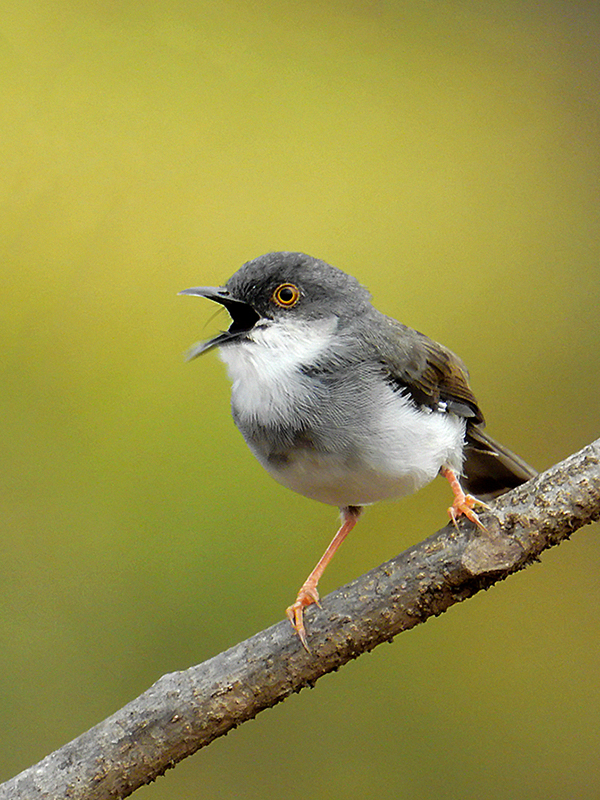
- P. h. albogularis from Mangaon, Raigad, Maharashtra Calls

Conservation status
- Least Concern (IUCN 3.1)

Scientific classification
- Kingdom: Animalia
- Phylum: Chordata
- Class: Aves
- Order: Passeriformes
- Family: Cisticolidae
- Genus: Prinia
- Species: P. hodgsonii

Binomial name
- Prinia hodgsonii Blyth, 1844

Synonyms
- Prinia gracilis Franklin, 1831 (preoccupied); Prinia adamsi Jerdon, 1863

= Grey-breasted prinia =

Grey-breasted prinia or Franklin's prinia

Species of bird

The grey-breasted prinia or Franklin's prinia (Prinia hodgsonii) is a wren-warbler belonging to the family of small passerine birds found mainly in warmer southern regions of the Old World. This prinia is a resident breeder in the Indian subcontinent, Sri Lanka and southeast Asia. Like other prinias, it often holds the tail upright but it is easily told by a smoky grey band across the breast which contrasts with a white throat. The beak is all black while the legs are pink. The tail is graduated as in other prinias and the grey feathers are tipped in white. In the breeding plumage the upperparts are grey while non-breeding birds are pale above with rufous wings and a weak supercilium. It is found in scrub, forest clearings and other open but well vegetated habitats. It can be confused with the rufescent prinia.

== Taxonomy ==
This species was named by James Franklin as Prinia gracilis in 1831 based on a specimen that he obtained on the Ganges between Calcutta and Benares. It was renamed as Prinia hodgsonii by Edward Blyth in 1844 since the name Sylvia gracilis had been in use for the graceful prinia (described earlier in 1823 by Martin Lichtenstein) clashed when treated in the same genus Prinia. It was also described as Prinia adamsi by Jerdon and as Prinia humilis by Hume. This was placed in a separate genus Franklinia by Blyth and this treatment was followed by Jerdon and by others including Hugh Whistler who separated this species from the genus Prinia and placed it in the genus Franklinia which he considered distinct on the basis of having twelve tail feathers rather than ten and in having distinct breeding and non-breeding plumages. The merging of Prinia and Franklinia was supported by H. G. Deignan. The species has a widespread distribution and populations that show distinct plumages have been described as subspecies:

- P. h. hodgsonii Blyth, 1844 - the nominate subspecies is a resident of the Indian Peninsula from the Gangetic plains to Mysore in the south and extending east to Bangladesh. This loses the breast band in the non-breeding season and moults into grey-olive upperparts.
- P. h. rufula Godwin-Austen, 1874 - is a resident in the Himalayan foothills from lower Swat in Pakistan to Arunachal Pradesh in eastern India. It makes altitudinal movements descending south in winter. This has a tinge of rufous on the flanks and on the upper-body.
- P. h. albogularis Walden, 1870 - of the Western Ghats has the broadest and darkest breast band.
- P. h. pectoralis Legge, 1874 - is resident in the eastern and southeastern part of Sri Lanka. It sports the grey breast-band throughout the year. The band is incomplete in the middle for females. An alternate name of P. h. leggei was proposed due to the idea that it might clash with the name of Malcorus pectoralis but the original name is retained since the other species is placed in a different genus.
- P. h. erro Deignan, 1942 - geographic range from East Myanmar to Thailand and South Indochina.
- P. h. confusa Deignan, 1942 - geographic range from South China to Northeast Laos and N Vietnam.

== Description ==
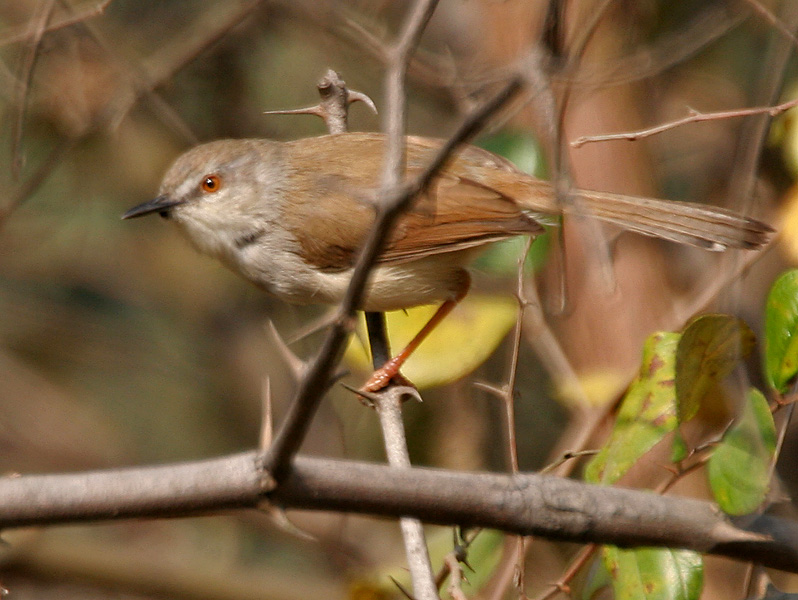
Non-breeding nominate subspecies with short supercilium and olive brown upperparts (Hyderabad, India)

These 11-to-13-centimetre (4 to 5 in) long warblers have a longish grey tail with graduated feathers that are tipped in white, they have strong pinkish legs and a short black bill. The eye ring is orange. The sexes look alike in most populations except in P .h. pectoralis of Sri Lanka where the female can be told apart by the incomplete breast band. The underparts are buff white and the grey breast band contrasts with the white throat in the breeding season. They have a rufous wing panel and the upperparts are smoky grey during the breeding season and olive brown in the non-breeding period. Non-breeding birds have a short indistinct white supercilium and often lack the breast band. Young birds are like non-breeding adults but more rufous above. The distinctive greyer endemic race in Sri Lanka, P. h. pectoralis, retains the summer-type plumage all year round. Young birds have a pale lower mandible. The tail feathers are shorter in summer than in the non-breeding winter plumage.

== Habitat and distribution ==
This skulking passerine bird is typically found in open woodland, scrub jungle, bushes and hedgerows amidst cultivation. Also found in bamboo jungle, mangrove swamps and reeds. P. h. rufula has been observed in patches of sugarcane near Kathmandu valley.

It is a common resident of the Indian peninsula. It migrates slightly south during winter. The distribution extends from Himalayan foothills to Southern India and to eastern Indian states Arunachal Pradesh, Nagaland, Manipur, Meghalaya and Assam. The species distribution extends to Pakistan, Burma, Vietnam, Sri Lanka and Yunnan province in southern China. Its altitude ranges from plains and goes up to 1000 meters (3280 ft) P. h. hodgsonii and up to 1800 meters (5900 ft) P. h. rufula in Meghalaya.

== Behavior and ecology ==
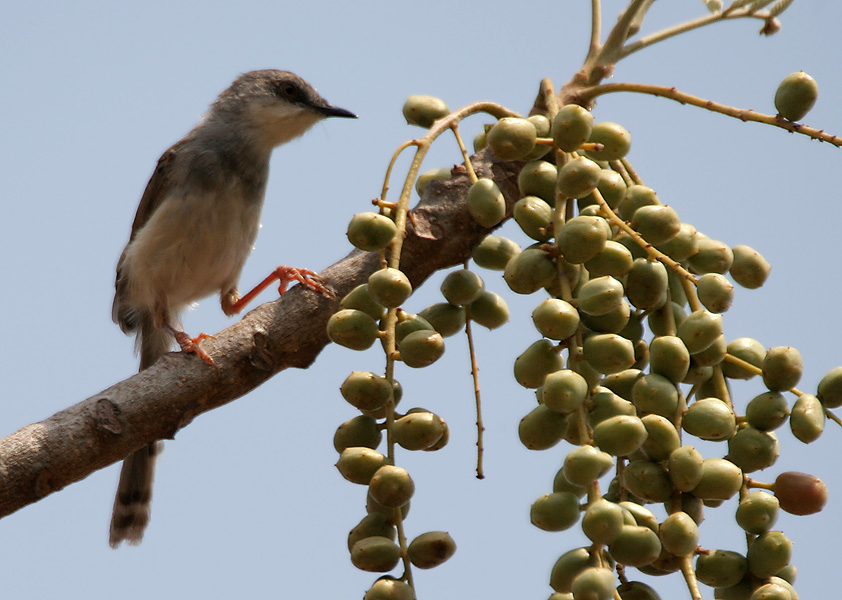
The graduated tail with white tips is visible from below (Andhra Pradesh)

Like most warblers, grey-breasted prinias are insectivorous. They feeds mainly on insects like ants, small beetles, caterpillars which are found among twigs and foliage of small trees. They also feeds on nectar from blossoms of trees like Erythrina and Bombax and during summer their forehead is sometimes sprinkled with pollen giving them an orange or yellowish head that can lead to mistaken identification.

Usually found in pairs or small groups, they sometimes forms parties of five or more (up to twenty) individuals. It jerks its tail as it flits between branches.

The breeding season begins with the rains. The male sings from a high perch and also performs aerobatic manoeuvers with rising and falling before diving with song notes. The song is a squeaky series of calls: chiwee-chiwee-chiwi-chip-chip-chip (or yousee-yousee-yousee-which-which-which-which). The nest is a cup of grass placed between leaves that are sewn together with cobwebs and resembles the nest of a common tailorbird but tends to be placed closer to the ground. The typical clutch consists of three or four eggs. The eggs vary in colour and they include glossy blue, pinkish white, greenish-blue or even pure white. They usually have reddish brown speckles at the broad end. Both parents incubate the eggs which hatch after about ten to eleven days. More than one brood may be raised in a season.

== Call ==
In breeding season, the male gives a spirited performance from an exposed perch excitedly warbling his squeaky yousee-yousee-yousee-which-which-which song. A conversational call-note, zee zee zee is uttered as the birds move along.
