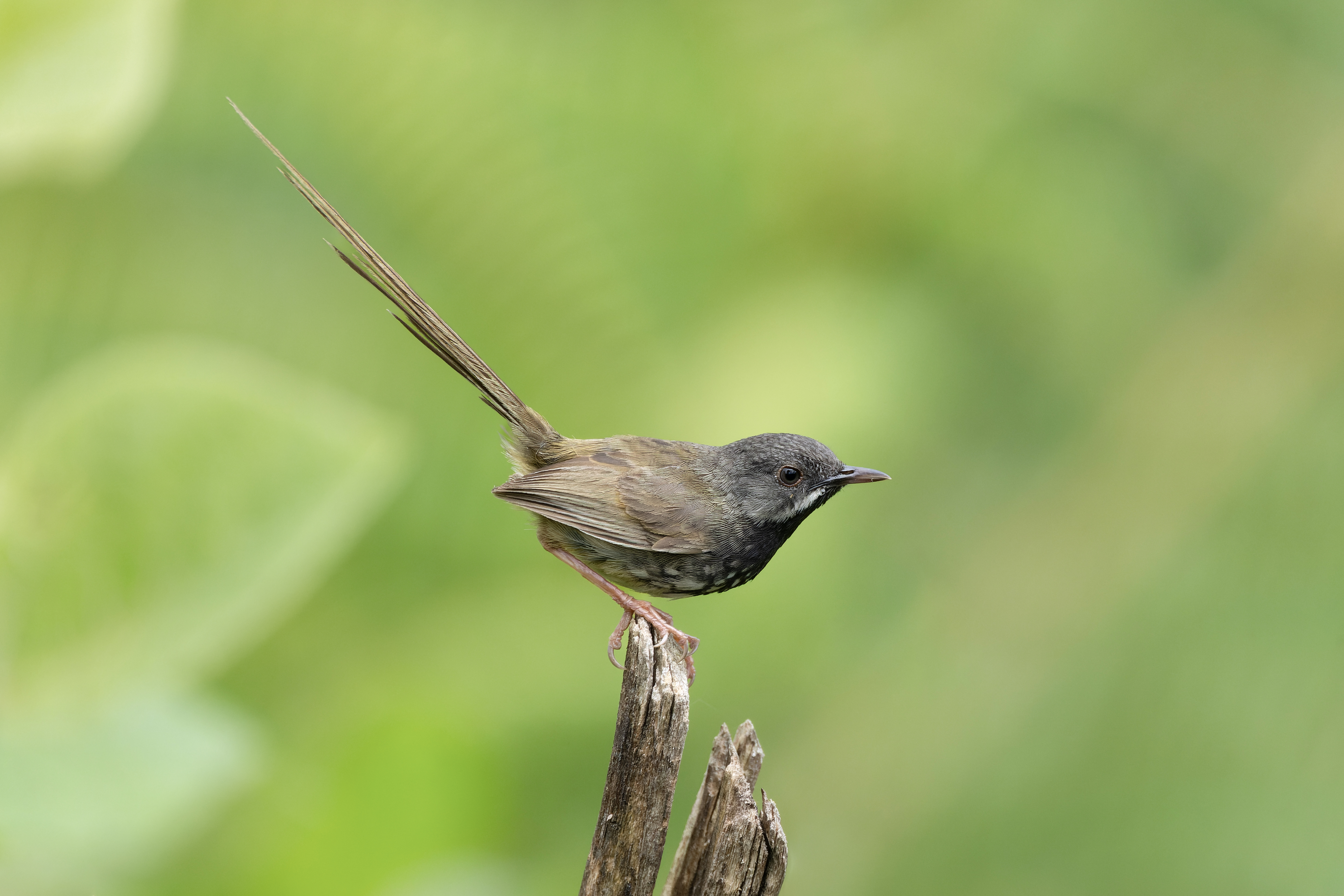
- Black-throated Prinia (Prinia atrogularis) in Mungpoo, West Bengal, India.

Conservation status
- Least Concern (IUCN 3.1)

Scientific classification
- Kingdom: Animalia
- Phylum: Chordata
- Class: Aves
- Order: Passeriformes
- Family: Cisticolidae
- Genus: Prinia
- Species: P. atrogularis

Binomial name
- Prinia atrogularis (Moore, F, 1854)

= Black-throated prinia =

Species of bird

The black-throated prinia (Prinia atrogularis) is a species of bird in the family Cisticolidae. It is found in the eastern Himalayas from eastern Nepal through northern India, Bhutan and southwestern China. The species was considered to be the same species as the hill prinia, a widespread species in Southeast Asia, and the rufous-crowned prinia of eastern India and Myanmar, but is now treated as a separate species on the basis of morphology, song and genetic studies. The rufuos-crowned prinia is considered its closest relative based on mitochondrial DNA sequence data, and they are thought to have diverged from each other 3.4 million years ago.

The black-throated prinia is a large prinia, 12 to 17 cm (4.7–6.7 in) and weighing 8–16 g (0.28–0.56 oz). Its tail is extremely long, making up to 10 cm (3.9 in) of its total length. Males and females look alike, but males are slightly larger than females and have a comparatively longer tail. The throat is white during the non-breeding season, but is black, breaking up into black splotches on the breast, during the breeding season.

The black-throated prinia is found in scrubby and open habitats, including forest edge and clearings, generally from 900–2,800 m (3,000–9,200 ft) above sea-level. It is reported to be a partial altitudinal migrant, with birds reported as low down as 300 m (980 ft) during the winter, but it has also been recorded as high up as 2,200 m (7,200 ft) during the winter as well.

The black-throated prinia is an active forager, being encountered singly, in pairs or small family groups near the ground in tangled vegetation. It is very active, foraging while continuously moving its long tail. It feeds on insects, but its diet has not been described in detail. It breeds between March and June, the next being a round clump of grasses attached to grass stalks 60 cm (24 in) above the ground. Three to five greenish eggs with red splotches are laid, and incubated for ten days. Both parents incubate the eggs and care for the chicks.
