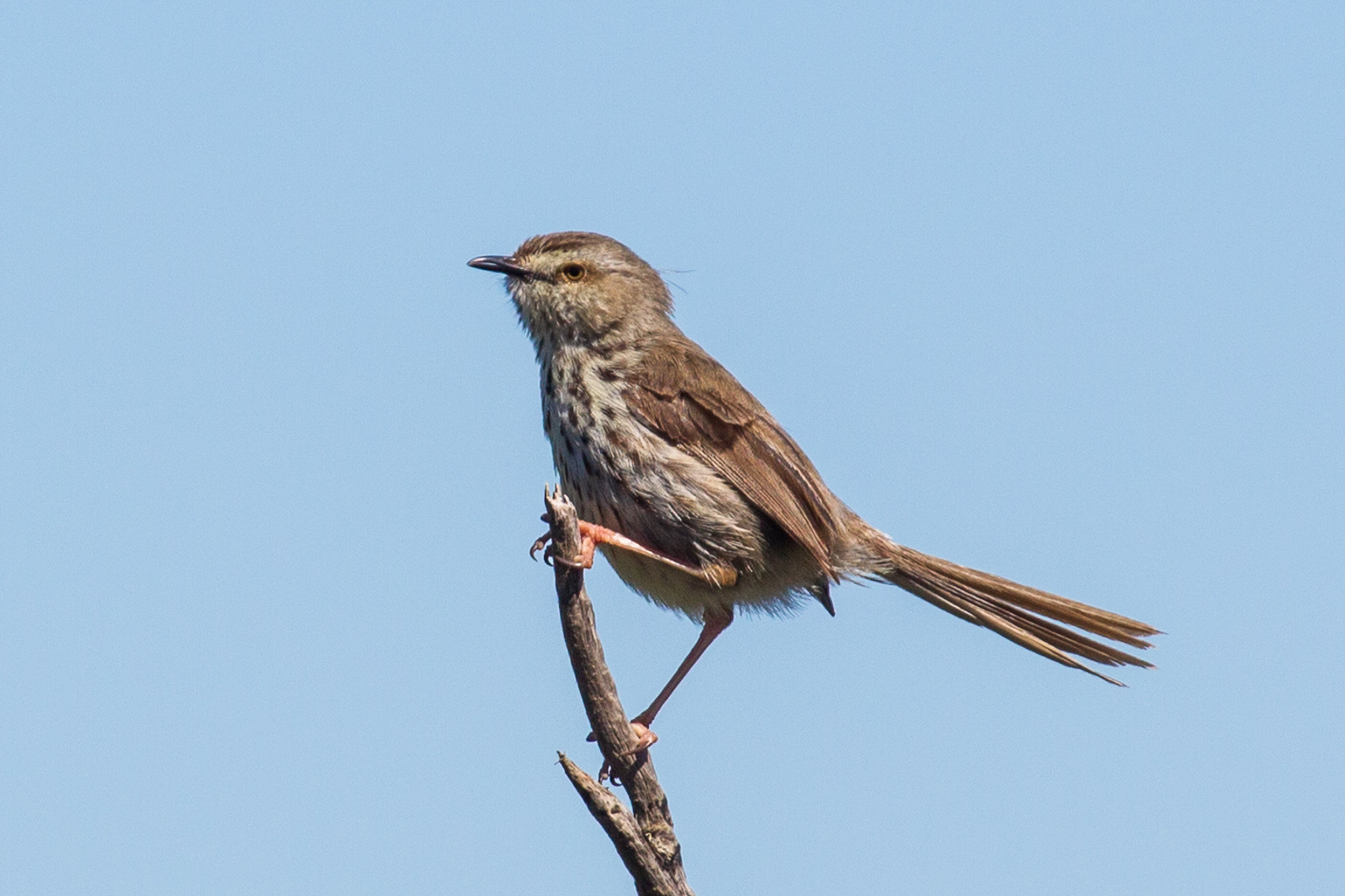

Conservation status
- Least Concern (IUCN 3.1)

Scientific classification
- Kingdom: Animalia
- Phylum: Chordata
- Class: Aves
- Order: Passeriformes
- Family: Cisticolidae
- Genus: Prinia
- Species: P. maculosa

Binomial name
- Prinia maculosa (Boddaert, 1783)

= Karoo prinia =

Species of bird

The Karoo prinia or spotted prinia (Prinia maculosa) is a small passerine bird. It is a resident breeder in South Africa, Lesotho and far southern Namibia.

It is a species found in karoo scrub, fynbos and bracken-covered slopes in semi-desert and mountains. The former eastern subspecies P. m. hypoxantha is now usually considered to be a separate species, the Drakensberg prinia, P. hypoxantha.

== Taxonomy ==
The Karoo prinia was described by the French polymath Georges-Louis Leclerc, Comte de Buffon in 1779 in his Histoire Naturelle des Oiseaux. The bird was also illustrated in a hand-coloured plate engraved by François-Nicolas Martinet in the Planches Enluminées D'Histoire Naturelle, which was produced under the supervision of Edme-Louis Daubenton to accompany Buffon's text. Neither the plate caption nor Buffon's description included a scientific name but in 1783 the Dutch naturalist Pieter Boddaert coined the binomial name Montacilla maculosa in his catalogue of the Planches Enluminées. Buffon believed that his specimen had come from the Cape of Good Hope. The type locality was changed to Swellendam, in South Africa, by Phillip Clancey in 1963. The Karoo prinia is now placed in the genus Prinia that was introduced by the American naturalist Thomas Horsfield in 1821. The name of the genus is derived from the Javanese prinya, the local name for the bar-winged prinia (Prinia familiaris). The specific maculosa is from the Latin maculosus meaning "spotted".

Three subspecies are recognised:

- P. m. psammophila Clancey, 1963 – southwest Namibia and western South Africa
- P. m. maculosa (Boddaert, 1783) – southern Namibia and central, southern South Africa
- P. m. exultans Clancey, 1982 – southeast South Africa and Lesotho

== Description ==
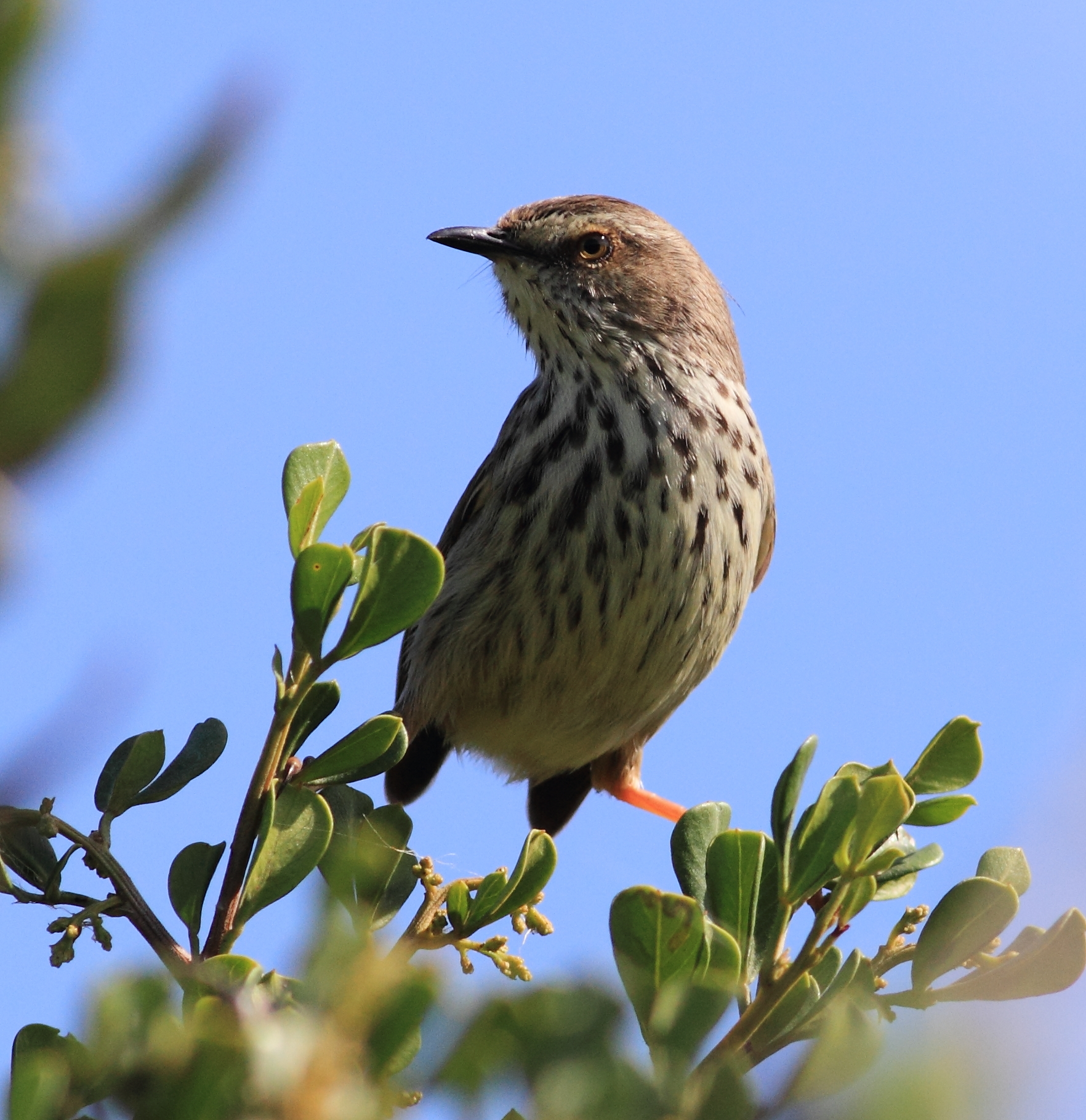
In Rondevlei Nature Reserve, Cape Town, South Africa

The Karoo prinia is 13–15 cm (5.1–5.9 in) long, with short rounded wings, a longish tail, strong legs and a short straight black bill. The head has a whitish eyebrow and the upperparts are otherwise brown. The throat and lower face are whitish with dark streaking and the rest of the underparts are yellowish white or yellow with distinct black streaking. The long tail has a dark spot near the end and is typically cocked up at an angle. The feet and legs are pinkish-brown, and the eye is dark brown. The sexes are identical, but juveniles are much yellower below than the adults and less heavily streaked.

The calls of this species include a sharp chleet-chleet-chleet-chleet-chleet-chleet, and a fast buzzy tit-tit-tit-tit-tit.

The Karoo prinia can only be confused with the closely related Drakensberg prinia, but has less yellow underparts with heavier spotting than that species.

== Behaviour ==
The Karoo prinia builds a thin-walled oval nest with a side entrance from green grass. It is well hidden deep inside a leafy shrub or bush. Breeding is from August to September in areas with winter rainfall, but later (up to December) elsewhere.

The Karoo prinia is usually seen in pairs or small groups, typically low in scrub, but sometimes perching on the top of a bush. It actively forages for small insects, with tail cocked and frequently swung side-to-side.

== Conservation status ==
This common species has a large range, with an estimated extent of 670,000 km^{2}. The population size is believed to be large, and the species is not believed to approach the thresholds for the population decline criterion of the IUCN Red List (i.e. declining more than 30% in ten years or three generations). For these reasons, the species is evaluated as Least Concern.
