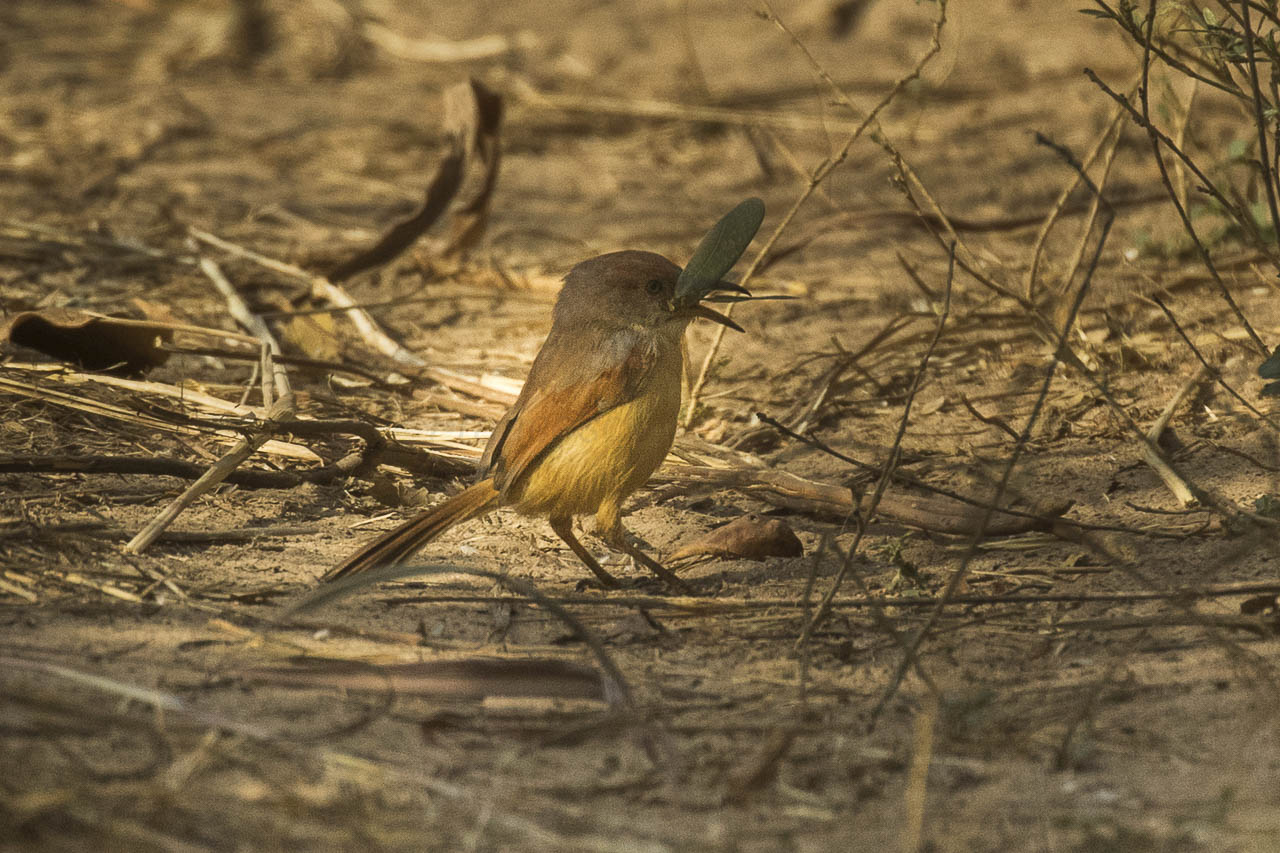
- Eating grasshopper, in Gambia

Conservation status
- Least Concern (IUCN 3.1)

Scientific classification
- Kingdom: Animalia
- Phylum: Chordata
- Class: Aves
- Order: Passeriformes
- Family: Cisticolidae
- Genus: Prinia
- Species: P. erythroptera

Binomial name
- Prinia erythroptera (Jardine, 1849)

= Red-winged prinia =

Species of bird

The red-winged prinia or the red-winged warbler (Prinia erythroptera) is a bird species in the family Cisticolidae. It formerly belonged in the monotypic genus Heliolais. It is found in Benin, Burkina Faso, Cameroon, Central African Republic, Chad, Democratic Republic of the Congo, Ivory Coast, Ethiopia, Gambia, Ghana, Guinea, Guinea-Bissau, Kenya, Liberia, Malawi, Mali, Mozambique, Niger, Nigeria, Senegal, Sierra Leone, Sudan, Tanzania, Togo, Uganda, Zambia, and Zimbabwe, where its natural habitat is dry savanna.

== Taxonomy ==
The red-winged prinia was described by the Scottish naturalist William Jardine in 1849 under the binomial name Drymoica erythroptera. The type locality is West Africa. The specific epithet erythroptera comes from the Ancient Greek eruthros for "red" and -pteros, "-winged".

There are four subspecies:

- P. e. erythroptera (Jardine, 1849) – Senegal to northern Cameroon
- P. e. jodoptera (Heuglin, 1864) – central Cameroon to southern Sudan and northwestern Uganda
- P. e. major (Blundell & Lovat, 1899) – Ethiopia
- P. e. rhodoptera (Shelley, 1880) – Kenya to eastern Zimbabwe and Mozambique

Most taxonomists place this species in the genus Prinia rather than in its own monotypic genus Heliolais. Support for this alternative placement is provided by a molecular phylogenetic study of the Cisticolidae published in 2013 that found that the red-winged warbler was closely related to the prinias.
