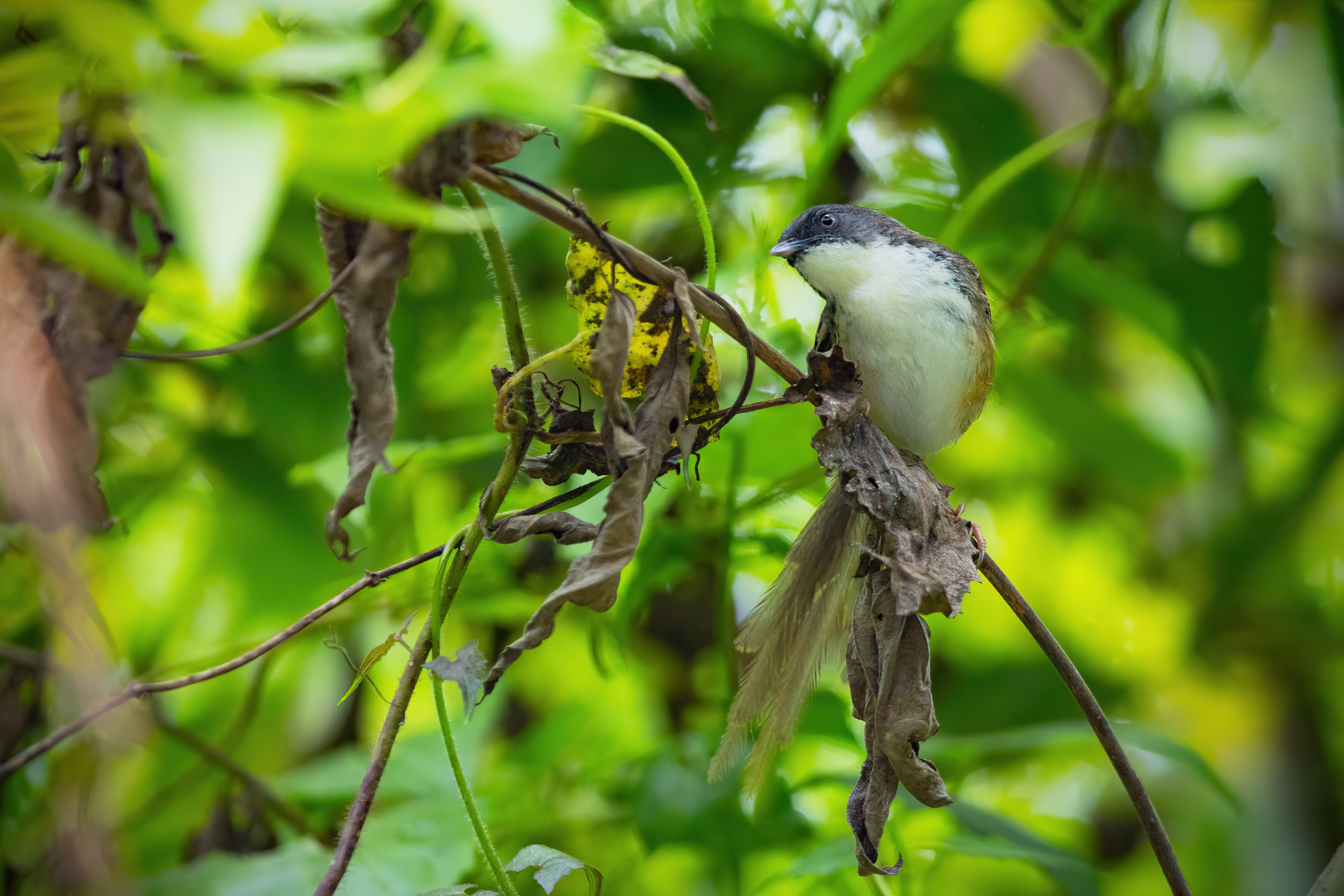
- Photograph taken in Thailand

Conservation status
- Least Concern (IUCN 3.1)

Scientific classification
- Kingdom: Animalia
- Phylum: Chordata
- Class: Aves
- Order: Passeriformes
- Family: Cisticolidae
- Genus: Prinia
- Species: P. superciliaris

Binomial name
- Prinia superciliaris (Anderson, 1871)

= Hill prinia =

Species of bird

The hill prinia (Prinia superciliaris) is a species of passerine bird in the family Cisticolidae.

It is found in China, India, Indonesia, Laos, Malaysia, Myanmar, Thailand and Vietnam. It was formerly considered con-specific with the black-throated prinia.
