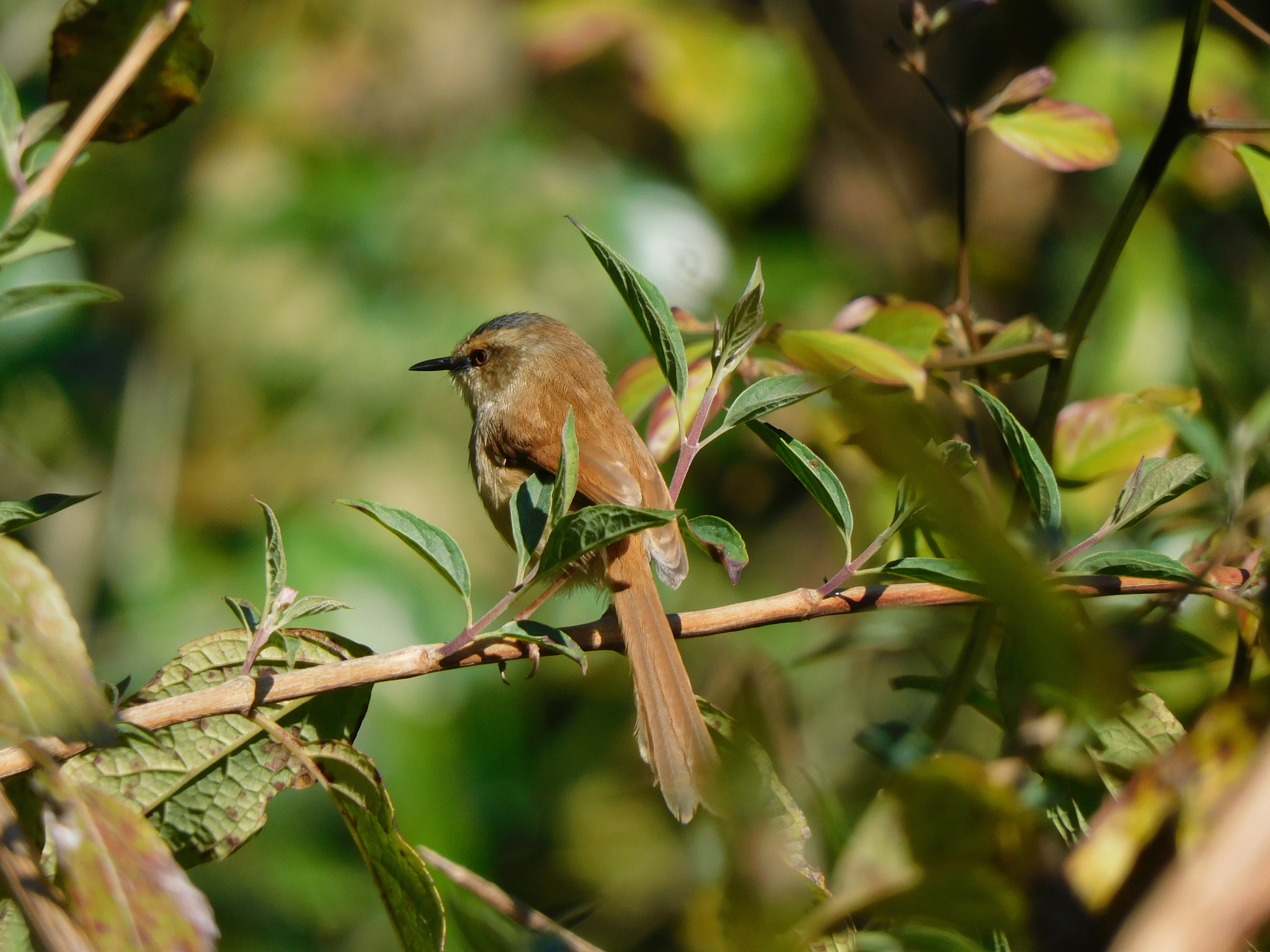

Conservation status
- Vulnerable (IUCN 3.1)

Scientific classification
- Kingdom: Animalia
- Phylum: Chordata
- Class: Aves
- Order: Passeriformes
- Family: Cisticolidae
- Genus: Prinia
- Species: P. cinereocapilla

Binomial name
- Prinia cinereocapilla Moore, F, 1854

= Grey-crowned prinia =

Species of bird

The grey-crowned prinia (Prinia cinereocapilla) is a species of bird in the family Cisticolidae. It is found in Bhutan, northern India and Nepal. Its natural habitats are subtropical or tropical dry forest, subtropical or tropical moist shrubland, subtropical or tropical dry lowland grassland, subtropical or tropical seasonally wet or flooded lowland grassland, and arable land.It is threatened by habitat loss, including forest fires.

The grey-crowned prinia is 11 cm long and weighs 6–8·5 g. A small, neatly proportioned and relatively short-tailed prinia with small and slim bill. In fresh plumage has rufous forehead. During the breeding season, it has blue-gray ear-coverts, and no supercilium. It can be difficult to distinguish from other prinia.
