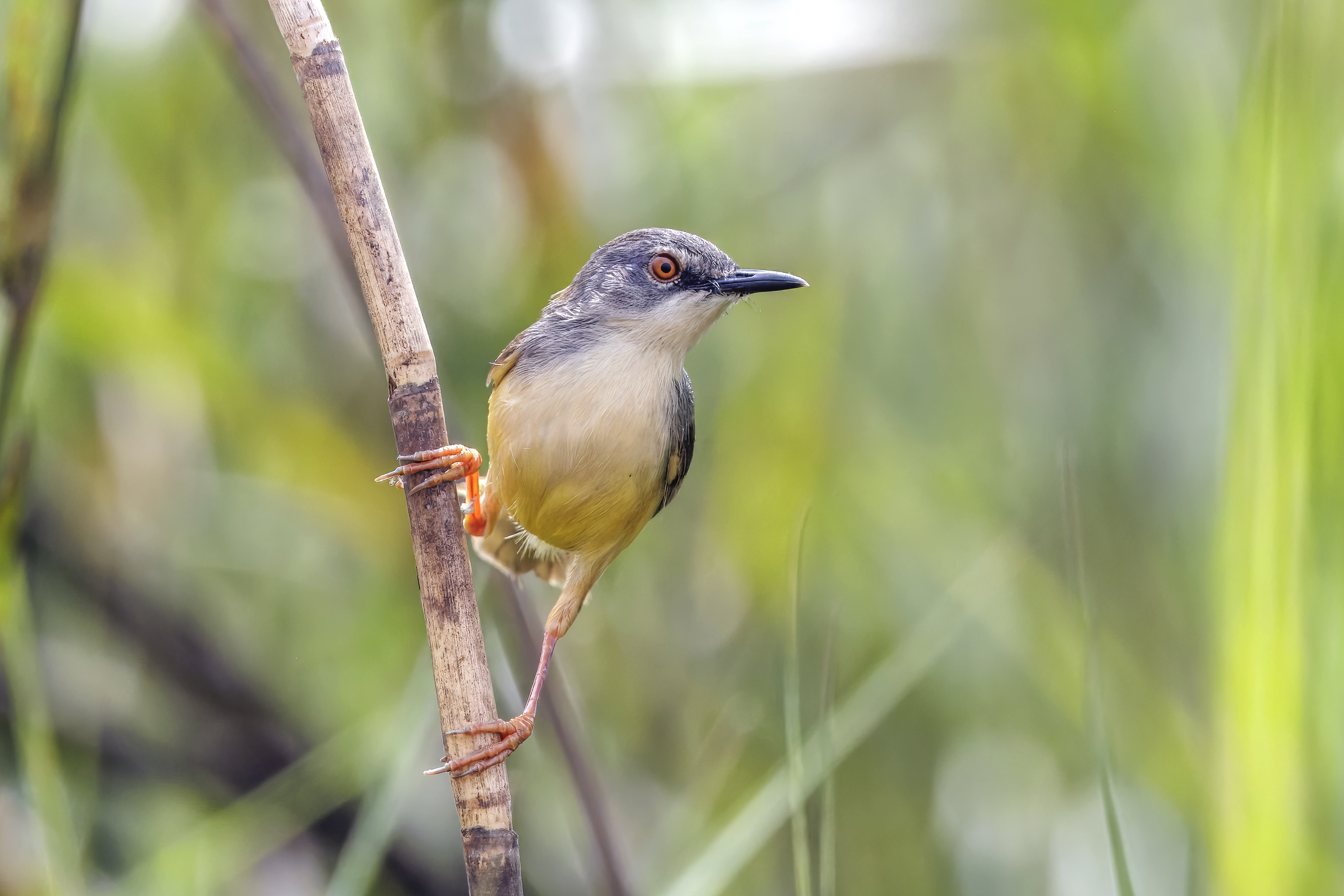
- In Cambodia

Conservation status
- Least Concern (IUCN 3.1)

Scientific classification
- Kingdom: Animalia
- Phylum: Chordata
- Class: Aves
- Order: Passeriformes
- Family: Cisticolidae
- Genus: Prinia
- Species: P. flaviventris

Binomial name
- Prinia flaviventris (Delessert, 1840)

= Yellow-bellied prinia =

Species of bird

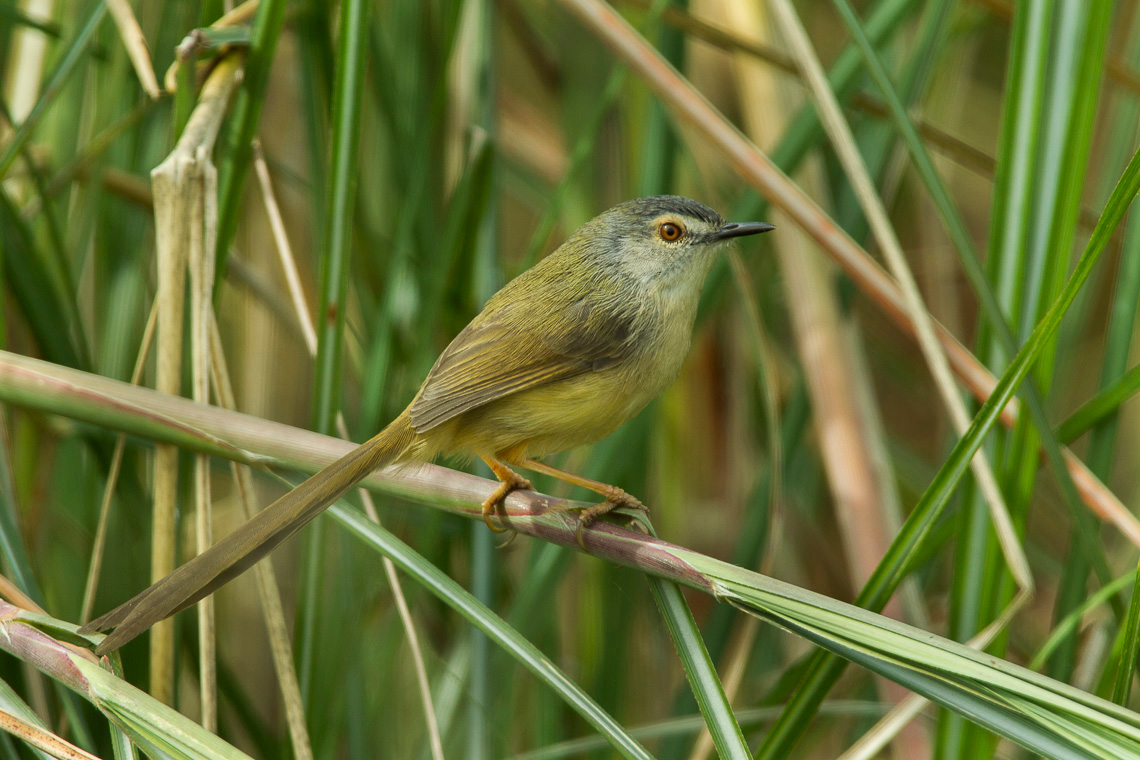

The yellow-bellied prinia (Prinia flaviventris) is a species of bird in the family Cisticolidae. It is found in Pakistan, the southern Himalayan foothills, the northeastern Indian subcontinent, and Southeast Asia.
