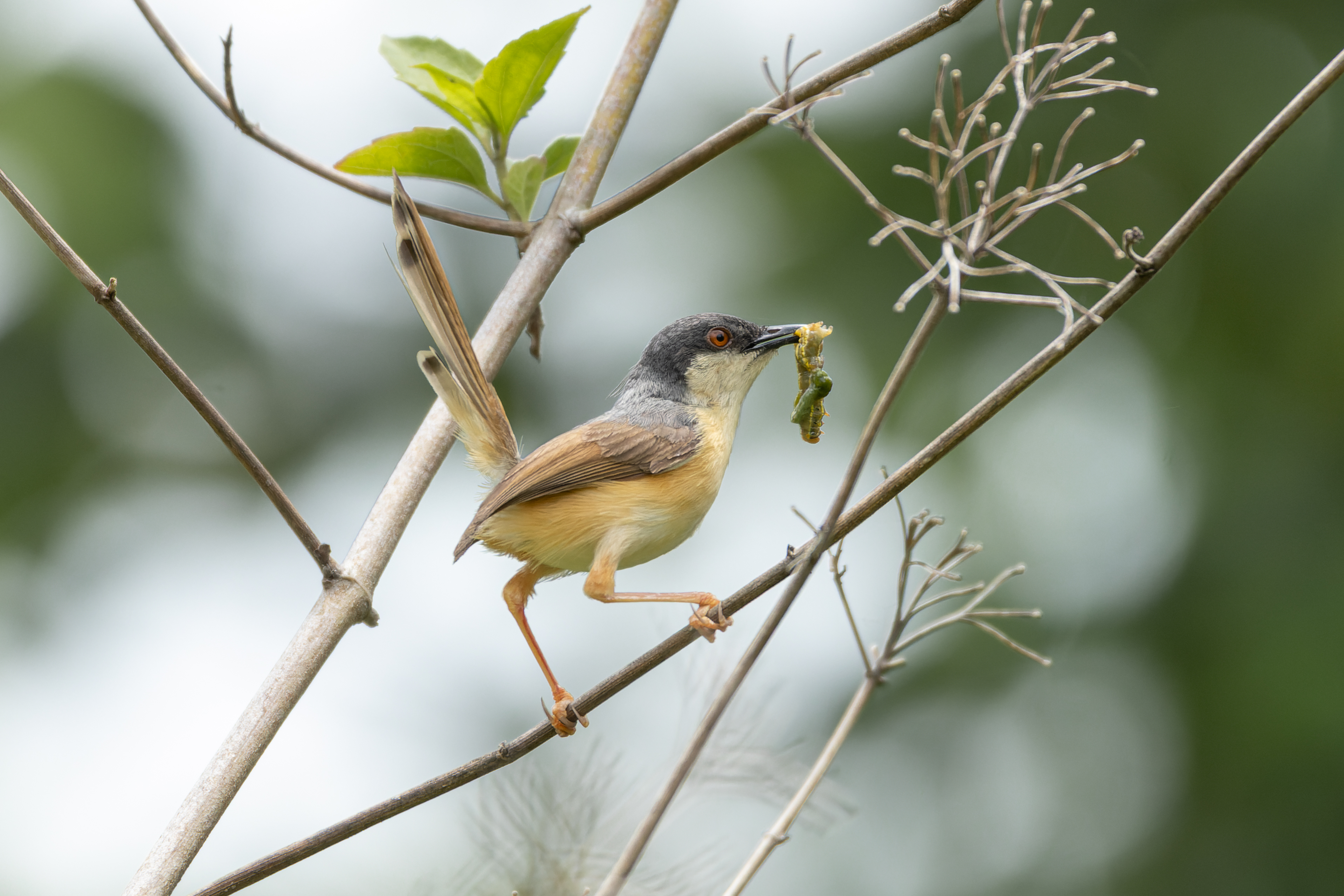
- Eating insect in Ajodhya Hills, West Bengal, India

Conservation status
- Least Concern (IUCN 3.1)

Scientific classification
- Kingdom: Animalia
- Phylum: Chordata
- Class: Aves
- Order: Passeriformes
- Family: Cisticolidae
- Genus: Prinia
- Species: P. socialis

Binomial name
- Prinia socialis Sykes, 1832
- Distribution of subspecies of Prinia socialis

Synonyms
- Burnesia socialis

Audio
- Calls with the "spark" sounds at end

= Ashy prinia =

Species of bird

The ashy prinia or ashy wren-warbler (Prinia socialis) is a small warbler in the family Cisticolidae. This prinia is a resident breeder in the Indian subcontinent, ranging across most of India, Nepal, Bangladesh, eastern Pakistan, Bhutan, Sri Lanka and western Myanmar. It is a common bird in urban gardens and farmlands in many parts of India and its small size, distinctive colours and upright tail make it easy to identify. The northern populations have a rufous rump and back and have a distinct breeding and non-breeding plumage while other populations lack such variation.

== Description ==
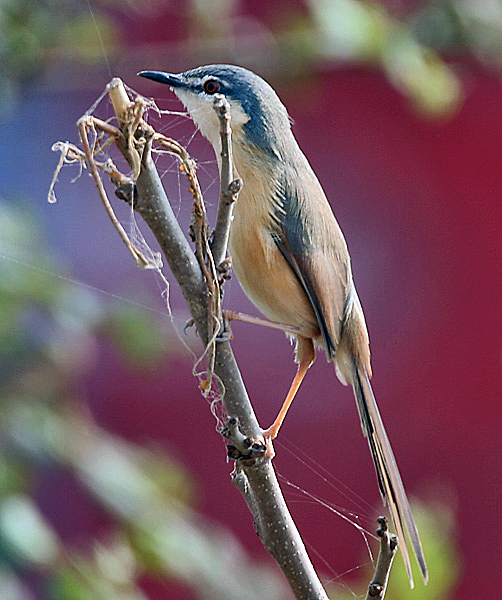
Prinia socialis stewartii with supercilium visible (Haryana, India)

These 13–14 cm long warblers have short rounded wings and a longish graduated cream tail tipped with black subterminal spots. The tail is usually held upright and the strong legs are used for clambering about and hopping on the ground. They have a short black bill. The crown is grey and the underparts are rufous in most plumages. In breeding plumage, adults of the northern population are ash grey above, with a black crown and cheek with no supercilium and coppery brown wings. In non-breeding season, this population has a short and narrow white supercilium and the tail is longer. They are found singly or in pairs in shrubbery and will often visit the ground.

In winter, the northern subspecies, P. s. stewartii Blyth, 1847, has warm brown upperparts and a longer tail and has seasonal variation in plumage. The other races retain summer plumage all year round. West Bengal and eastwards has the race inglisi Whistler & Kinnear, 1933, which is slatier above than the nominate race of the Peninsula and deeper rufous on the flanks with a finer and shorter beak. The distinctive endemic race in Sri Lanka, P. s. brevicauda Legge, 1879, has a shorter tail and the juveniles have yellowish underparts apart from a distinct call.

== Distribution and habitat ==
This passerine bird is found in dry open grassland, open woodland, scrub and in home gardens in many cities. The northern limits of the species are along the Himalayan foothills extending into the upper Indus river system. The species is absent from the dry desert zone of the west of India and extends east into Burma. The Sri Lankan population is found mainly in the lowlands but going up into the hills to about 1600 m.

== Behaviour and ecology ==
Like most warblers, the ashy prinia is insectivorous. Their song is a repetitive tchup, tchup, tchup or zeet-zeet-zeet. Another call is a nasal tee-tee-tee. It also makes a sound like "electric sparks" during its fluttery flight, which is thought to be produced by the wings, although one author suggests that it is made by the beak.

It is most easily distinguished by the loud snapping noise it makes during flight. How this noise is produced we do not know for certain. Reid was of opinion that the bird snapped its long tail. What exactly this means I do not know. Jesse believes that the sound is produced by the bird's mandibles. I have spent much time in watching the bird, and am inclined to think that the noise is caused by the beating of the wings against the tail. This last is constantly being wagged and jerked, and it seems to me that the wings beat against it as the bird flits about. When doves and pigeons fly, their wings frequently meet, causing a flapping sound. I am of opinion that something similar occurs when the ashy wren-warbler takes to its wings.

— Douglas Dewar

The non-migratory genus Prinia shows biannual moult, which is rare among passerines. One moult occurs in spring (April to May) and another moult occurs in autumn (October to November). Biannual moult is theorized to be favoured when ectoparasite loads are very high; however, no investigations have been made. Prinia socialis moults some remiges twice a year and is termed to have a partially biannual moult; however, some authors describe P. socialis socialis as having two complete moults.

Birds stay in pairs but roost singly on the branch of a small tree or shrub.

=== Breeding ===
The song is sung from the top of a bush and males make fluttery display flights with the tail held up. The ashy prinia builds its nest close to the ground in a shrub or tall grass. Several types of nests have been described, including a flimsy cup made by sewing several large leaves, an oblong purse-like structure with grass stems inside it, and a flimsy ball of grass. The usual nest is built low in a bush and consists of leaves stitched together with webs, lined with hair and having an entrance on the side. It lays 3 to 5 glossy, somewhat oval-shaped eggs which hatches in about 12 days. They vary in colour from brick-red to rich chestnut. The broad end of the egg is generally darker than the remainder of the shell, and exhibits a cap or zone. The eggs measure 15 to 17 mm (0.6 to 0.7 in) in length, and 11 to 13 mm (0.4 to 0.5 in) in breadth.

The breeding season varies with locality and has been recorded around the year, but mostly after the monsoons. In northern India it is mainly June to September and in Sri Lanka mainly December to March or August to October. Breeding season is during May to June in the Nilgiris. The species is believed to be monogamous, and both the male and the female take part in incubation and feeding, though to varying extents. Parents may spend more time at the nest during cool days. Plaintive and grey-bellied cuckoos are known to be brood parasites of this species. When the nest is threatened by predators such as cats, adults have been observed feigning injury.

Rare cases of birds reusing material from a nest to build a nest at a new location have been noted.

== Gallery ==
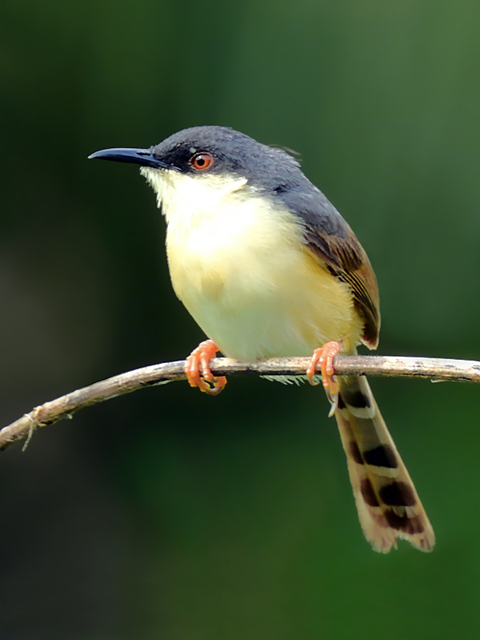
Prinia socialis socialis showing tail graduations

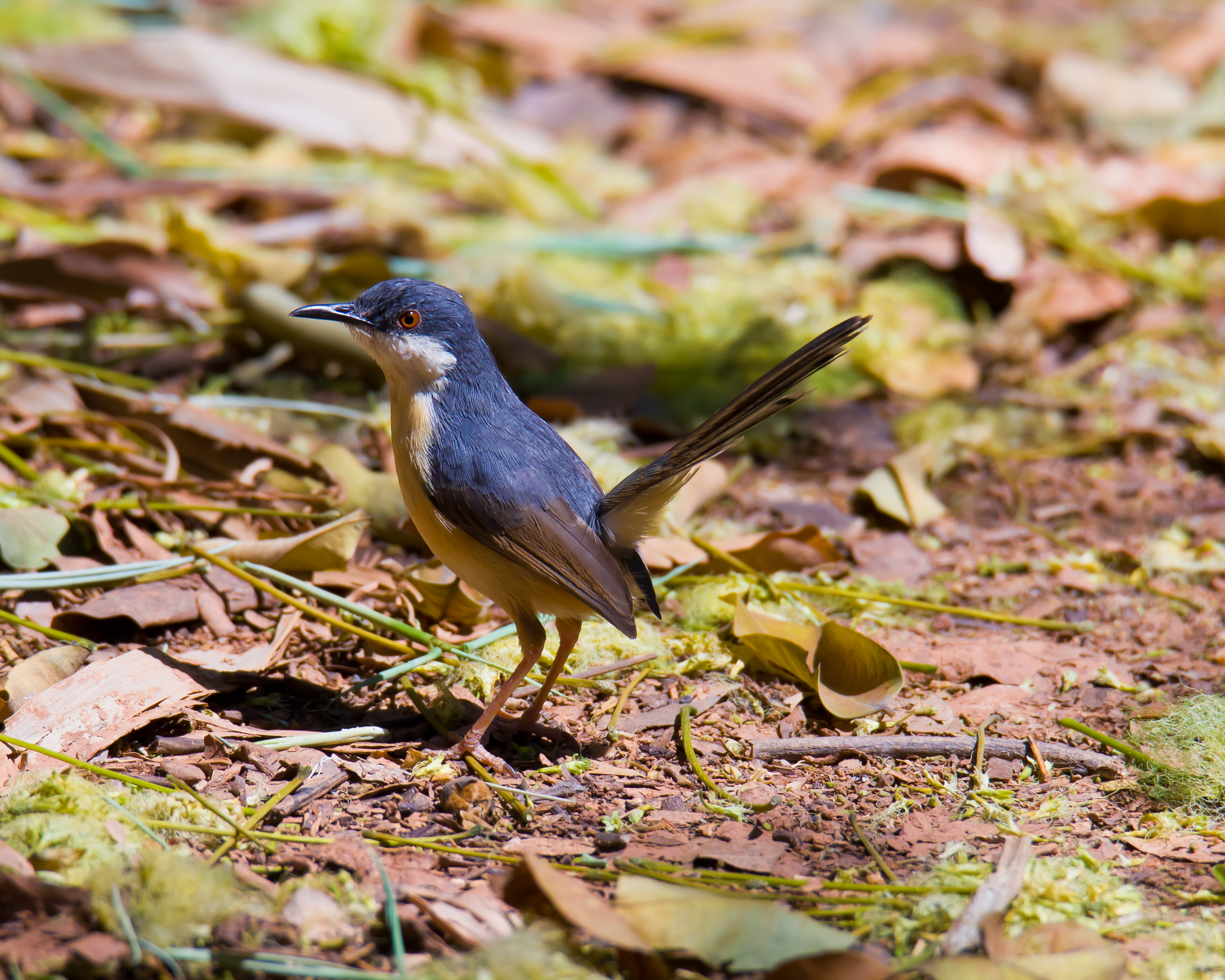
In Lalbagh, Bangalore

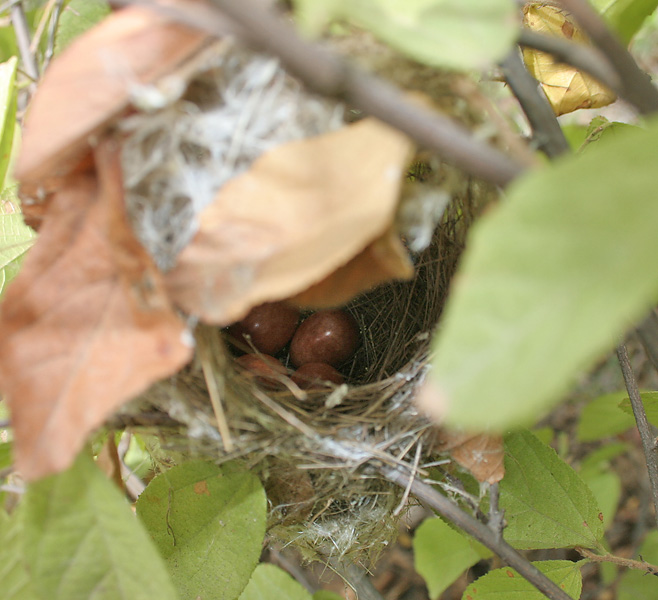
Nest with eggs, Hyderabad, India

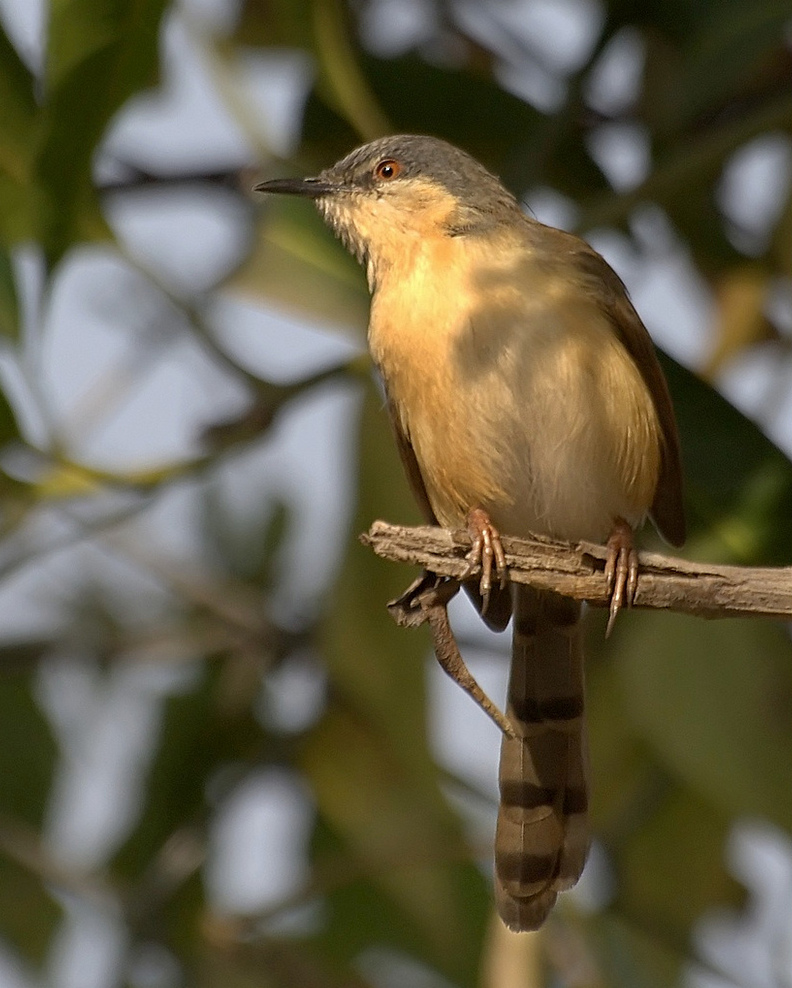
In Pune, India

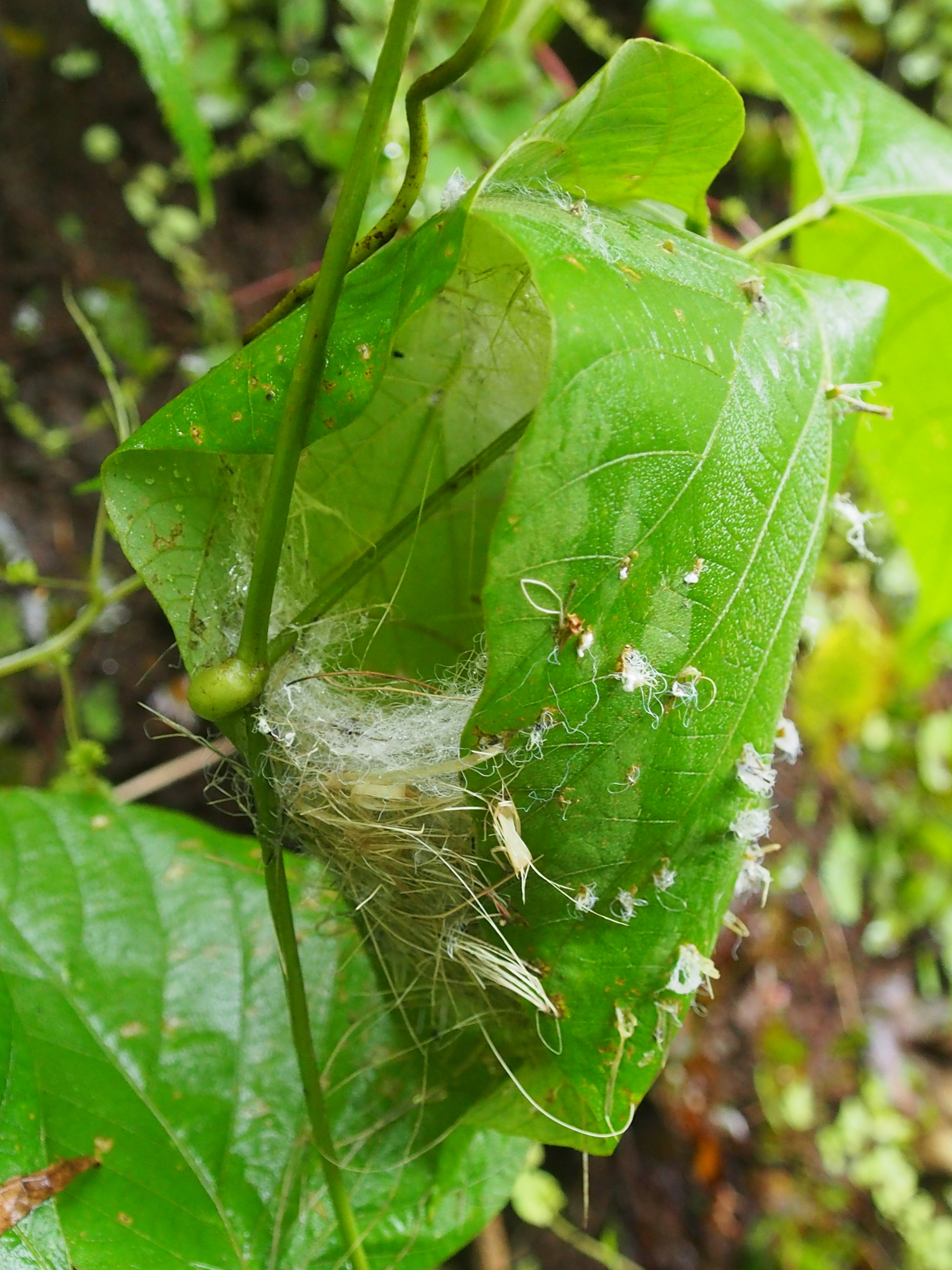
Ashy prinia nest, Mumbai

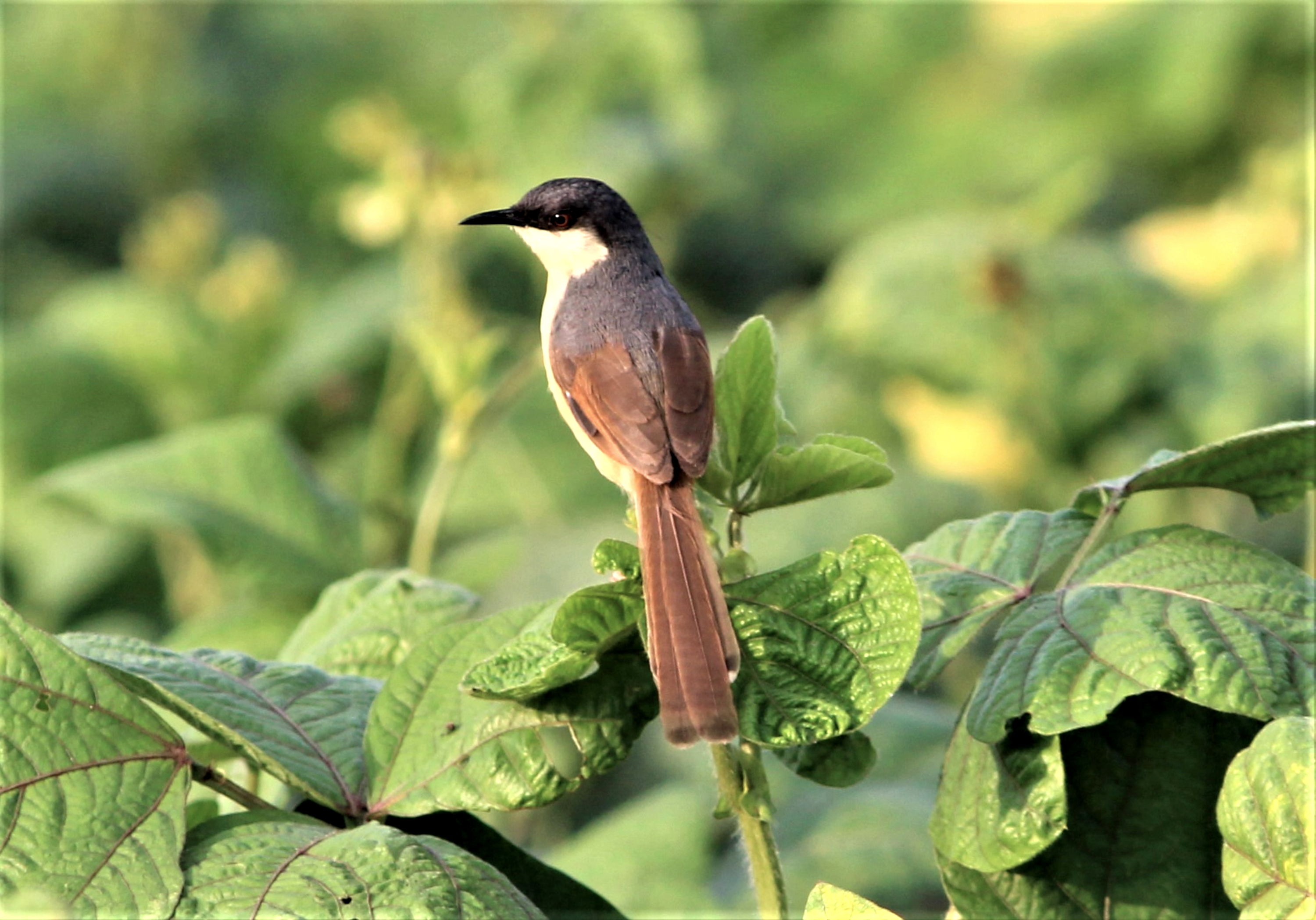
Ashy prinia near Chandigarh

== Other sources ==
- Balachandran, S; Rosalind, Lima (1992) Southern Ashy Wren-Warbler Prinia socialis socialis Sykes in Pt. Calimere Wildlife Sanctuary, Tamil Nadu. J. Bombay Nat. Hist. Soc. 89(3):377.
- Jairamdas, Arjun (1977) Three nests of Ashy Wren Warbler – diary of one season. Newsletter for Birdwatchers . 17(2):4–6.
- Subramanya, S.; Veeresh, G. K. (1998) Nesting of two insectivorous birds in the rice fields of Bangalore. Chap. 4. In: Birds in Agricultural Ecosystem. (Eds: Dhindsa, MS; Rao, P Syamsunder; Parasharya, BM) Society for Applied Ornithology, Hyderabad, 10–17.
- Ajmeri, R. M.; Das, A. R. K.; Sasikumar, M. (1961) An unusual nest of the Ashy Wren-warbler (Prinia socialis). Newsletter for Birdwatchers . 1(4):1.
