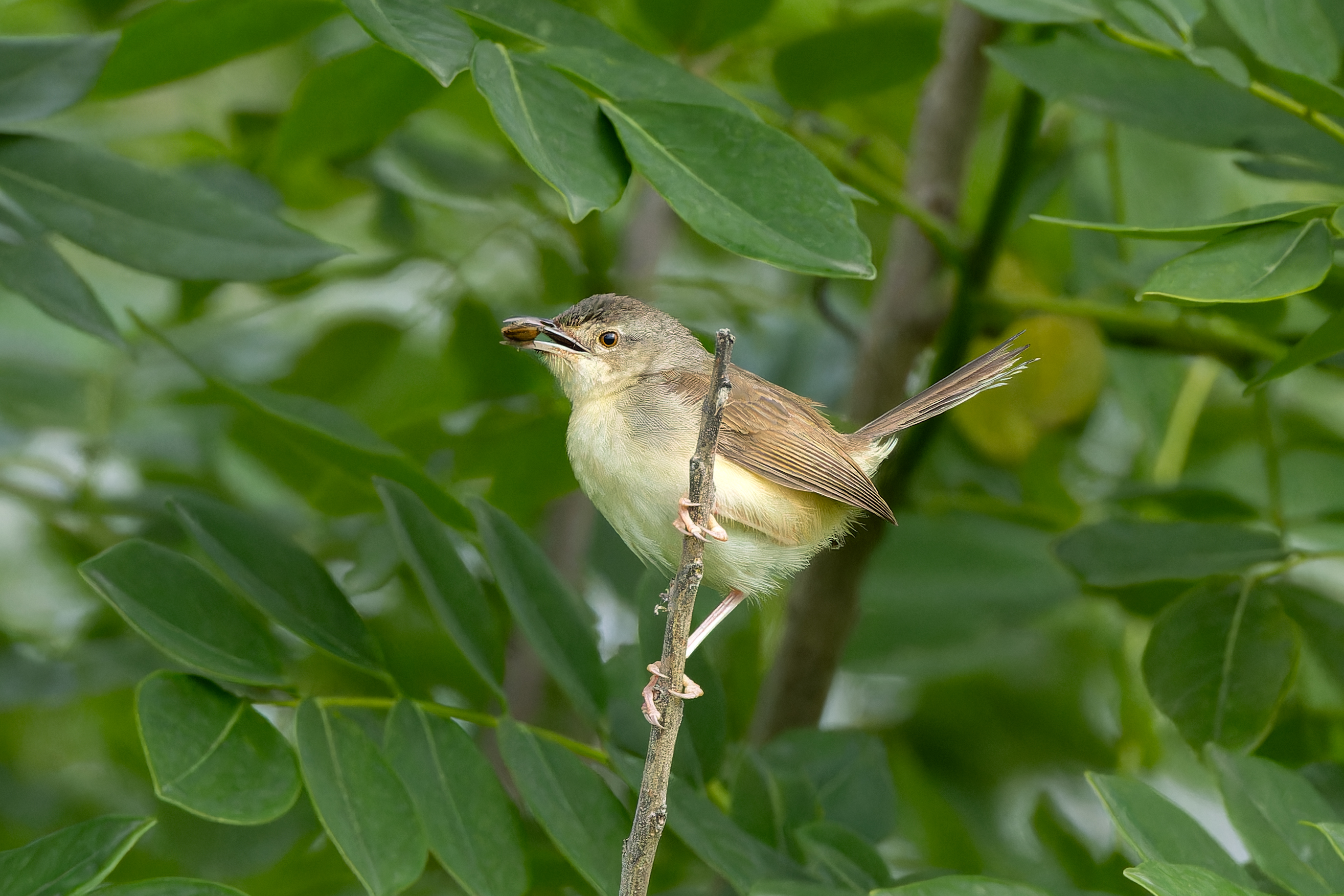
- In Saswad, Maharashtra, India.

Conservation status
- Least Concern (IUCN 3.1)

Scientific classification
- Kingdom: Animalia
- Phylum: Chordata
- Class: Aves
- Order: Passeriformes
- Family: Cisticolidae
- Genus: Prinia
- Species: P. sylvatica

Binomial name
- Prinia sylvatica Jerdon, 1840

= Jungle prinia =

Species of bird

The jungle prinia (Prinia sylvatica) is a small passerine bird, a warbler in the family Cisticolidae.

== Distribution and habitat ==
This prinia is a resident breeder in Bangladesh and India, far south-western Nepal, and Sri Lanka, typically found in dry open grassland, open woodland, scrub and sometimes gardens.

== Description ==
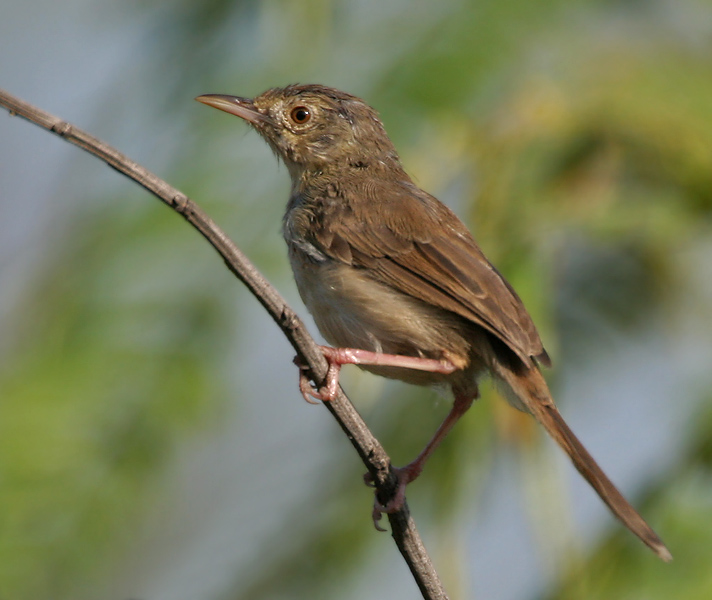
In Hyderabad, India

These 15 cm (6 in) long warblers have short rounded wings, a longish tail, strong legs and a short black bill. In breeding plumage, adults are grey-brown above, with a short white supercilium and warmer brown rump. There are rufous fringes on the closed wings and white edges to the tail. Underparts are whitish-buff. The sexes are identical except that the male has a blacker bill and mouth in the breeding season.

In winter, the upperparts are a warmer brown, and the underparts more buff. The tail is longer than in summer. There are a four races differing in plumage shade. The distinctive endemic race in Sri Lanka, P. s.valida, retains summer plumage, including the shorter tail, all year round, and lacks the supercilium and white in the tail.

== Behaviour ==
Like most warblers, the jungle prinia is insectivorous. It builds its nest in a shrub or tall grass and lays 3–5 eggs. The song is a repetitive pit-pretty, pit-pretty, pit-pretty.

Song of Jungle Prinia in Tamil Nadu, India
