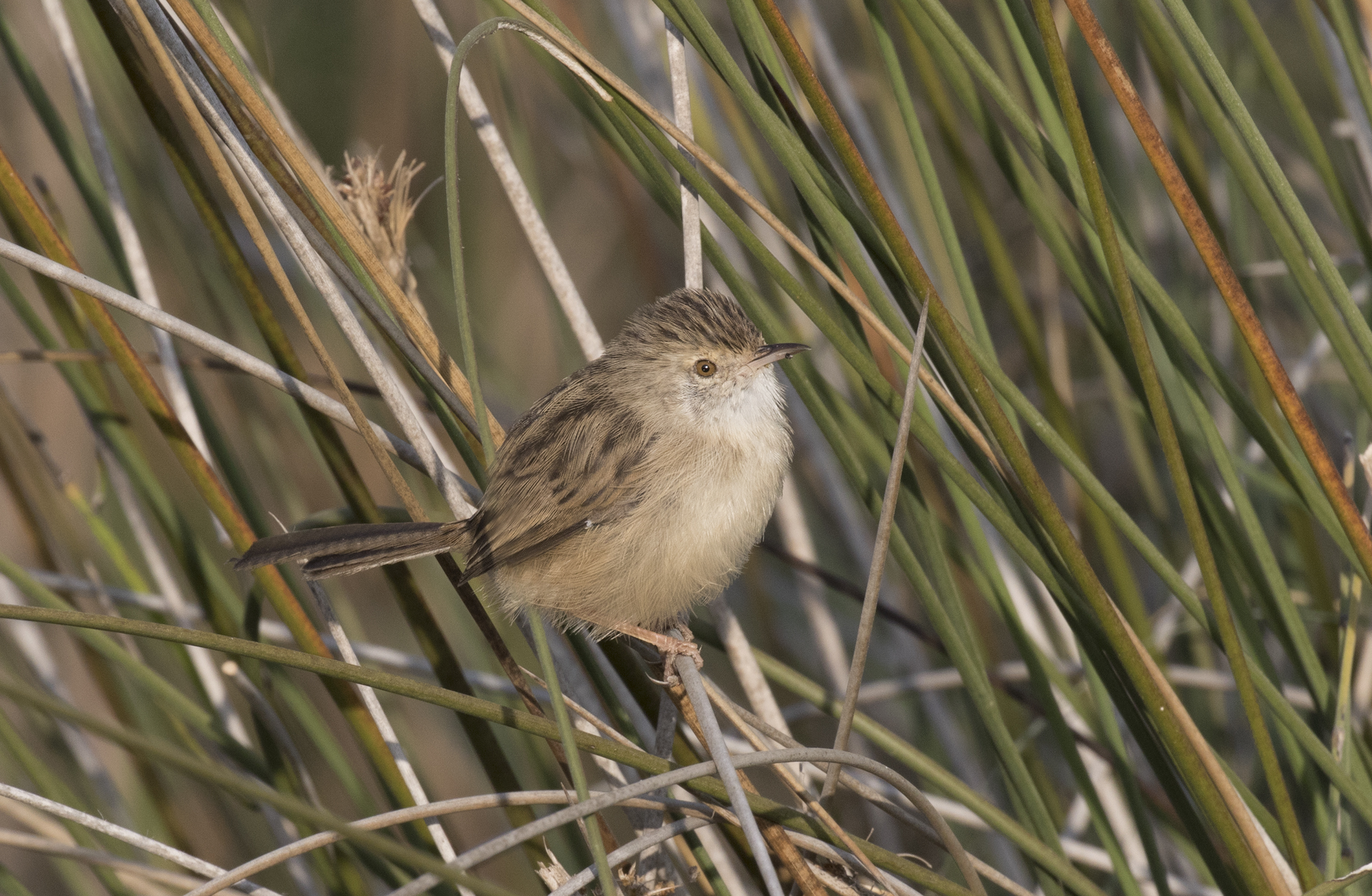
- In Sarıçam, Turkey

Scientific classification
- Domain: Eukaryota
- Kingdom: Animalia
- Phylum: Chordata
- Class: Aves
- Order: Passeriformes
- Family: Cisticolidae
- Genus: Prinia
- Species: P. lepida

Binomial name
- Prinia lepida Blyth, 1844

= Delicate prinia =

Species of bird

The delicate prinia (Prinia lepida) is a small warbler. This prinia is a resident breeder in southern Asia, from Turkey to North India.

There are 5 subspecies, of which P. g. akyildizi, of southern Turkey is the darkest, brownest, and most heavily streaked above, and has the brightest buff flanks.

== Taxonomy ==
A study published in 2021 concludes that the delicate prinia should be split from the graceful prinia.

- Prinia lepida, delicate prinia, 5 subspecies:
  - Prinia lepida akyildizi, S Turkey,
  - Prinia lepida irakensis, NE Syria, Iraq, SW Iran,
  - Prinia lepida carpenteri, N Oman,
  - Prinia lepida lepida, SE Iran, S Afghanistan, Pakistan, N India, C Nepal,
  - Prinia lepida stevensi, SE Nepal, NE India, Bangladesh.

The International Ornithological Congress followed this change in an update later that year.
