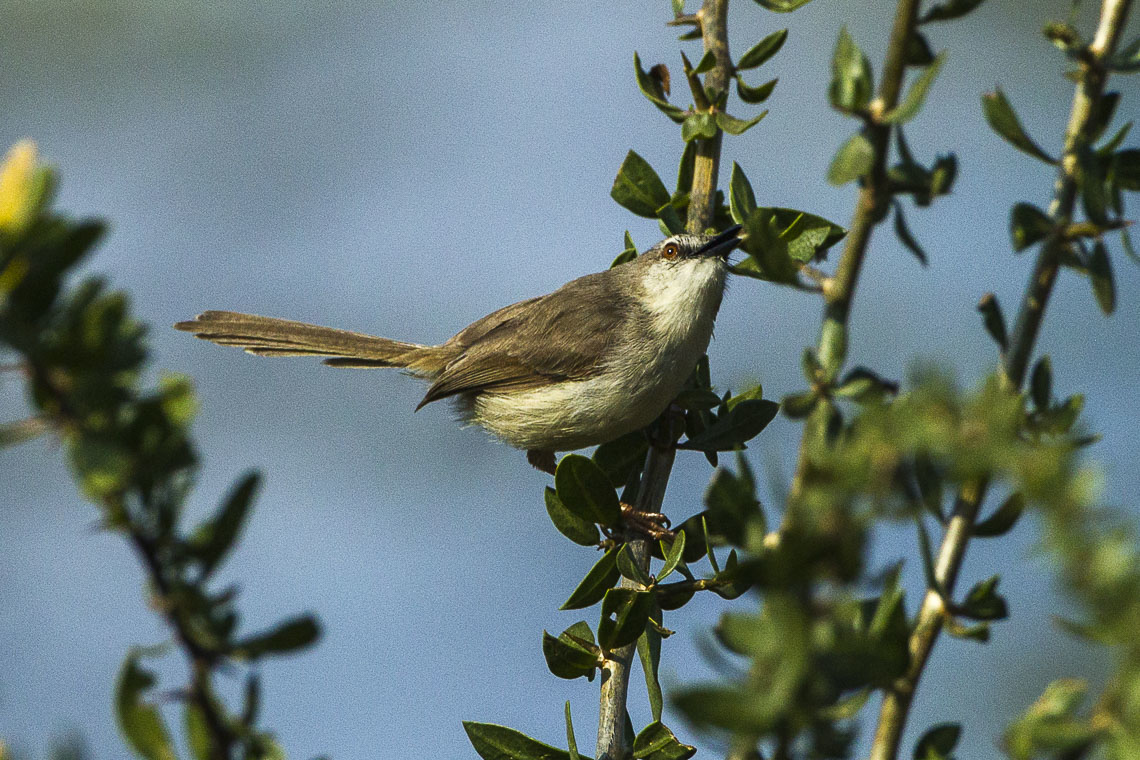

Conservation status
- Least Concern (IUCN 3.1)

Scientific classification
- Kingdom: Animalia
- Phylum: Chordata
- Class: Aves
- Order: Passeriformes
- Family: Cisticolidae
- Genus: Prinia
- Species: P. somalica

Binomial name
- Prinia somalica (Elliot, 1897)

= Pale prinia =

Species of bird

The pale prinia (Prinia somalica) is a species of bird in the family Cisticolidae. It is found in Ethiopia, Kenya, Somalia, and South Sudan. Its natural habitats are dry savanna and subtropical or tropical dry shrubland.
