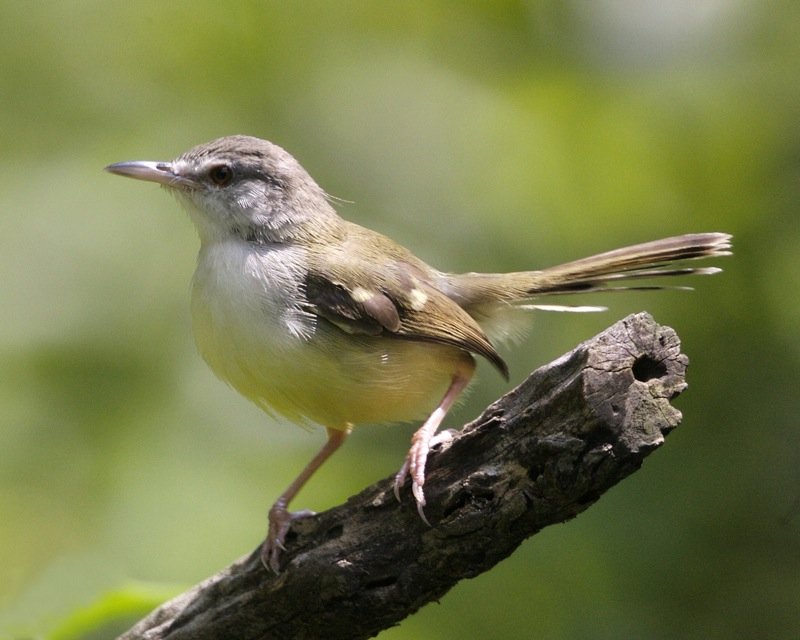
- Bar-winged prinia (Prinia familiaris)

Scientific classification
- Kingdom: Animalia
- Phylum: Chordata
- Class: Aves
- Order: Passeriformes
- Family: Cisticolidae
- Genus: Prinia; Horsfield, 1821

Type species
- Prinia familiaris Horsfield, 1821

Species
- See text

= Prinia =

Genus of birds

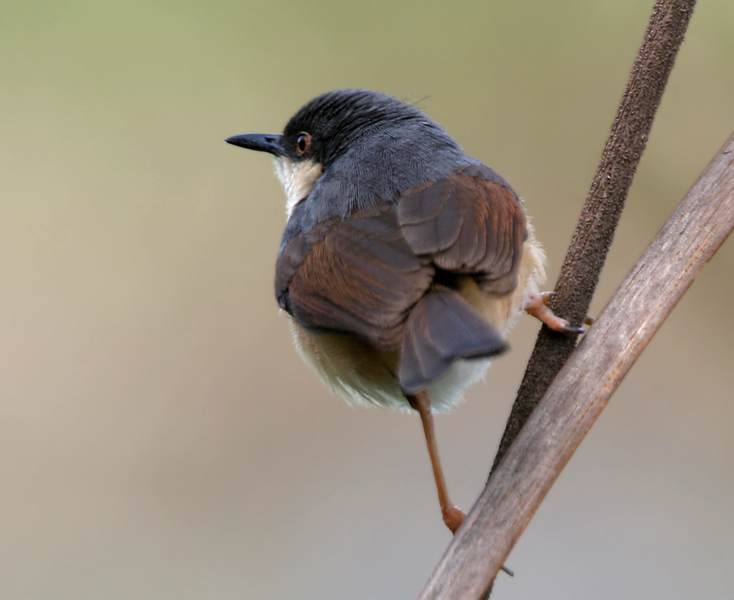
Ashy prinia (Prinia socialis) in Hyderabad, India

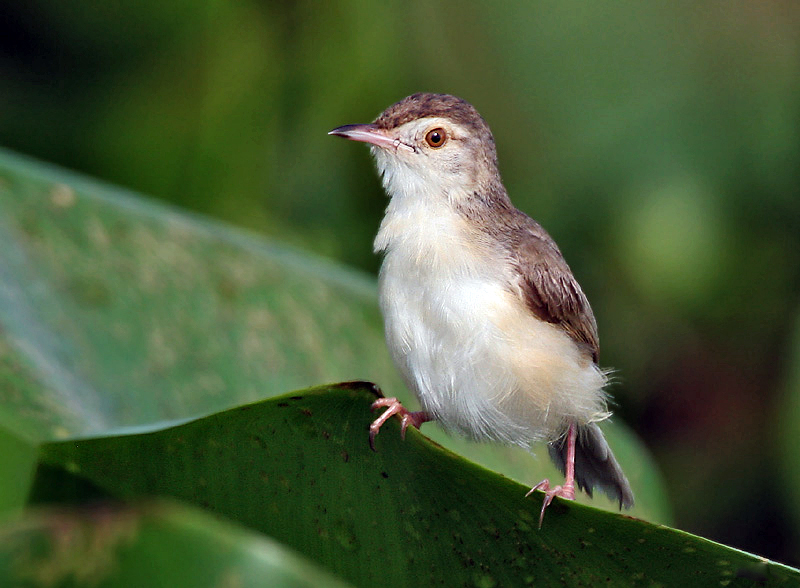
Plain prinia (Prinia inornata) in Kolkata, West Bengal, India

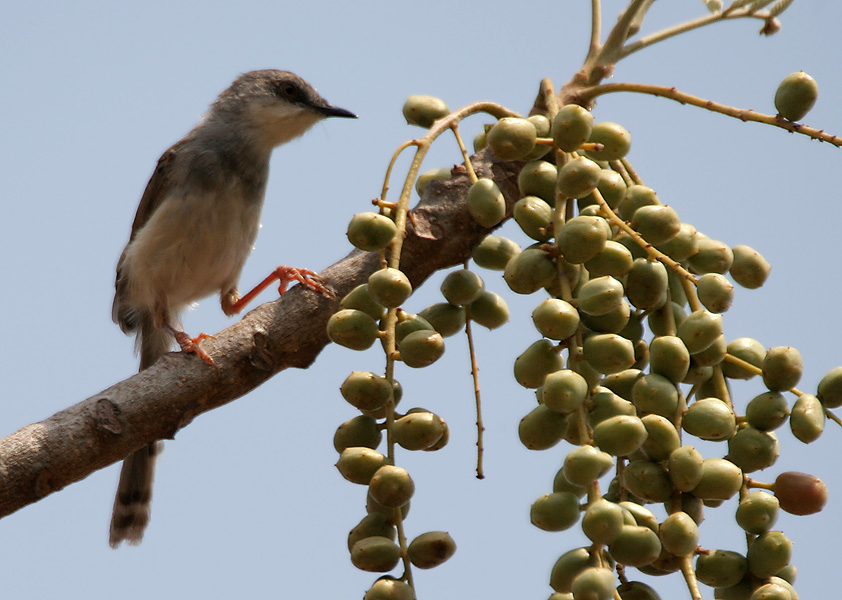
Grey-breasted prinia (Prinia hodgsonii) in Shamirpet, Rangareddy district, Andhra Pradesh, India

Prinia is a genus of small insectivorous birds belonging to the passerine bird family Cisticolidae. They were at one time classed in the Old World warbler family, Sylviidae.

The prinias are sometimes referred to as wren-warblers. They are a little-known group of the tropical and subtropical Old World, the roughly thirty species being divided fairly equally between Africa and Asia.

These are birds mainly of open habitats such as long grass or scrub, in which they are not easily seen. They are mainly resident, migration being limited to local cold weather movements. Non-breeding birds may form small flocks.

Prinias have short wings but long tapering tails. They are fairly drab birds, brown or grey above (sometimes with dark streaks) and whitish below. Some species have different breeding and non-breeding plumages. The bill is a typical insectivore's, thin and slightly curved.

== Taxonomy ==
The genus was erected by the American naturalist Thomas Horsfield in 1821. The type species is the bar-winged prinia (Prinia familiaris). The name of the genus is derived from the Javanese prinya, the local name for the bar-winged prinia.

A molecular phylogenetic study of the Cisticolidae published in 2013 found that the rufous-vented grass babbler did not lie within the clade containing the other prinias. Based on this analysis the rufous-vented prinia and the closely related swamp grass babbler were moved to the reinstated genus Laticilla in the family Pellorneidae.

=== Species ===
The genus contains the following 29 species:

Image	Common name	Scientific name	Distribution
	Himalayan prinia	Prinia crinigera	Himalayas and southern China
-	Striped prinia	Prinia striata	China, Taiwan
-	Brown prinia	Prinia polychroa	Indochina and Java
-	Burmese prinia	Prinia cooki	Burma and southern Yunnan
-	Annam prinia	Prinia rocki	Đà Lạt Plateau
	Black-throated prinia	Prinia atrogularis	eastern Himalayas
-	Rufous-crowned prinia	Prinia khasiana	Patkai
	Hill prinia	Prinia superciliaris	southern China and Southeast Asia
	Grey-crowned prinia	Prinia cinereocapilla	Himalayas
	Rufous-fronted prinia	Prinia buchanani	northern half of South Asia
	Rufescent prinia	Prinia rufescens	Indochina and northeast India
	Grey-breasted prinia	Prinia hodgsonii	Indochina and South Asia
	Graceful prinia	Prinia gracilis	Nile valley, coastal East Africa and Western Asia, northern South Asia
	Delicate prinia	Prinia lepida	Middle East and northern South Asia
	Jungle prinia	Prinia sylvatica	India and Sri Lanka
	Bar-winged prinia	Prinia familiaris	Sumatra and Java
	Yellow-bellied prinia	Prinia flaviventris	Indus valley, Himalayas and Southeast Asia
	Ashy prinia	Prinia socialis	South Asia
	Tawny-flanked prinia	Prinia subflava	Sub-Saharan Africa
	Plain prinia	Prinia inornata	Indomalaya
	Pale prinia	Prinia somalica	Horn of Africa
	River prinia	Prinia fluviatilis	western Sahel and far north-western Kenya
	Black-chested prinia	Prinia flavicans	southern Africa
	Karoo prinia	Prinia maculosa	far-southern Namibia, South Africa and Lesotho
	Drakensberg prinia	Prinia hypoxantha	eastern South Africa and Swaziland
	São Tomé prinia	Prinia molleri	São Tomé Island
	Banded prinia	Prinia bairdii	central Africa
	Red-winged prinia	Prinia erythroptera	Sub-Saharan Africa (except central, southern and Horn of Africa)
	Red-fronted prinia	Prinia rufifrons	eastern Sahel and Horn of Africa

Species formerly in Prinia but now moved to Laticilla in family Pellorneidae:

- Rufous-vented grass babbler, Laticilla burnesii
- Swamp grass babbler, Laticilla cinerascens
