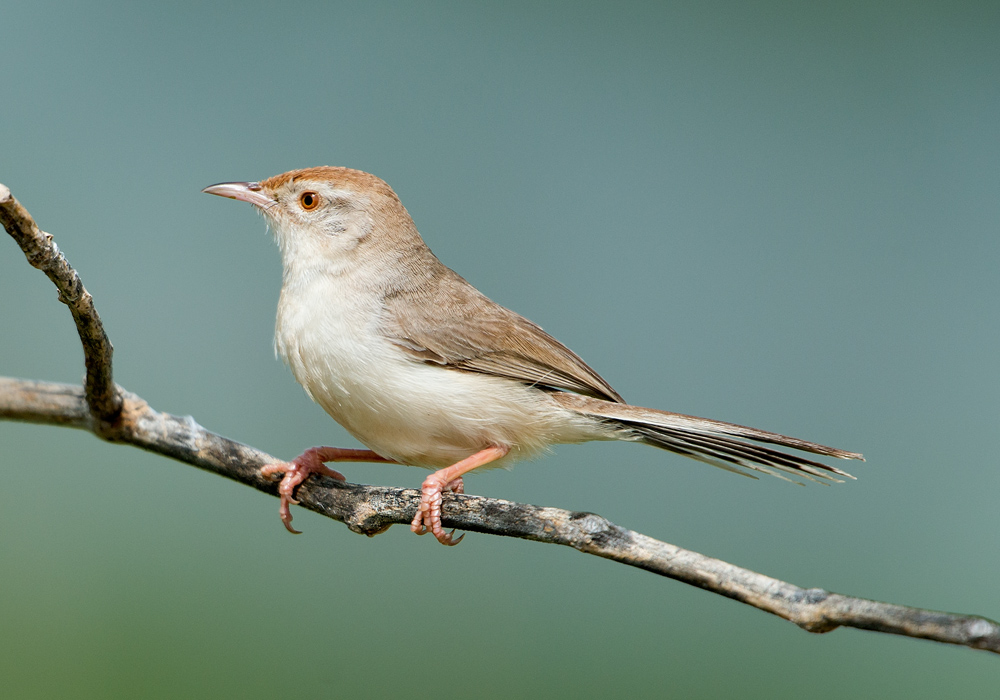
- In Rajasthan, India

Conservation status
- Least Concern (IUCN 3.1)

Scientific classification
- Kingdom: Animalia
- Phylum: Chordata
- Class: Aves
- Order: Passeriformes
- Family: Cisticolidae
- Genus: Prinia
- Species: P. buchanani

Binomial name
- Prinia buchanani Blyth, 1844

= Rufous-fronted prinia =

Species of bird

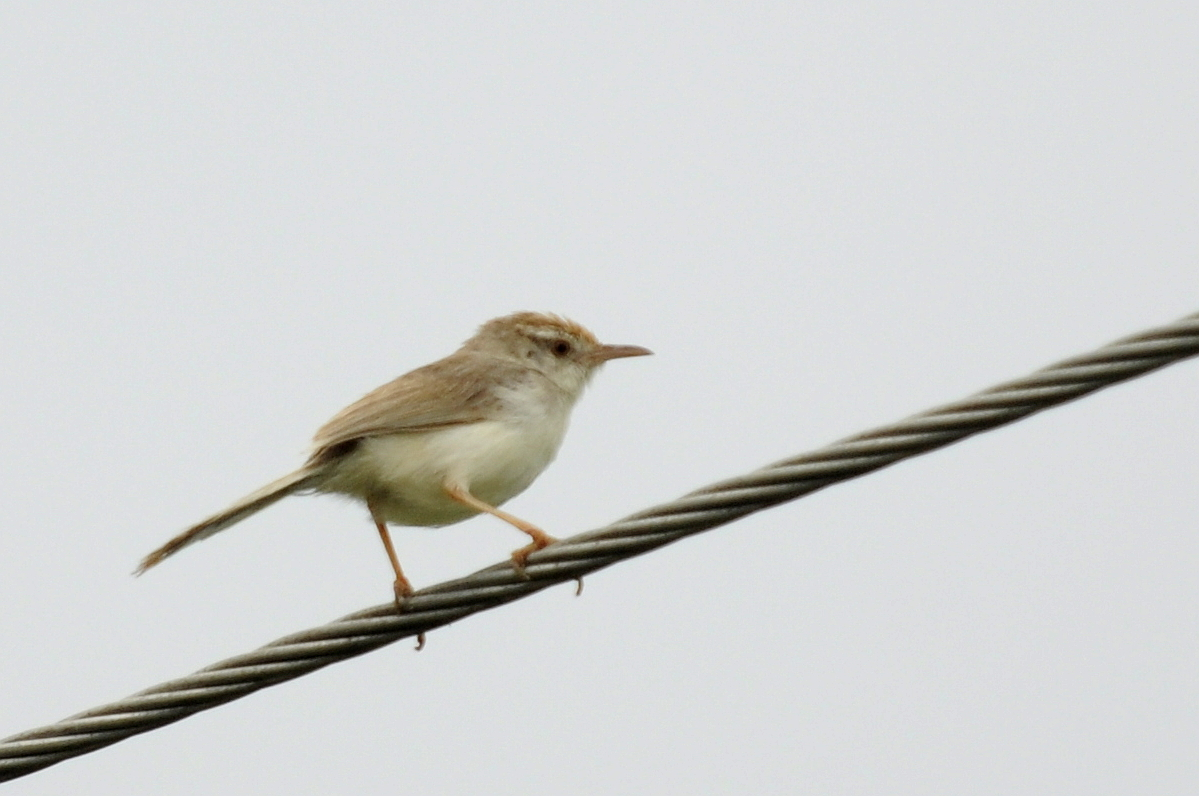
Rufous-fronted Prinia in Rajasthan

The rufous-fronted prinia (Prinia buchanani) is a species of bird in the family Cisticolidae. It is found in India and Pakistan. Its natural habitat is subtropical or tropical dry forest.

The species was described by Edward Blyth on the basis of an illustration of the bird from Bengal in the collections of Buchanan Hamilton.

== Description ==
The rufous-fronted prinia is a small stocky bird, generally 12 cm long and weighing between 5 and 6 grams. The upper parts are sandy color. The lower parts are off-white. The legs and toes are pink. Remiges and tail feathers are also sandy color. The underside of the tail is creamy white. The head is olive brown, and the bird has a pale eyebrow and a thin red eye circle. The beak is a classic insectivore, thin and slightly curved, and the eyes are reddish-orange.

== Reproduction ==
The nest is made of strips of grass woven together. It is built at one or two meters from the ground. The female generally lays between two and four eggs.

== Habitat and behavior ==
The rufous-fronted prinia is located in India and Pakistan. The species inhabits subtropical or tropical dry forest. It is also present in rocky areas, artificial land areas and dry open areas with sparse vegetation, such as plains and hills. It sneaks into the vegetation.

It is an insectivorous bird which feeds in the foliage or on the ground. It is a discreet bird that lets itself be approached. It emits a repetitive song from an exposed perch by wagging its tail.

They are mainly resident, migration is limited to local movements in cold weather. Non-breeding birds may form small flocks.

== Conservation status ==
The population is stable, it is considered by the IUCN as "least concern".
