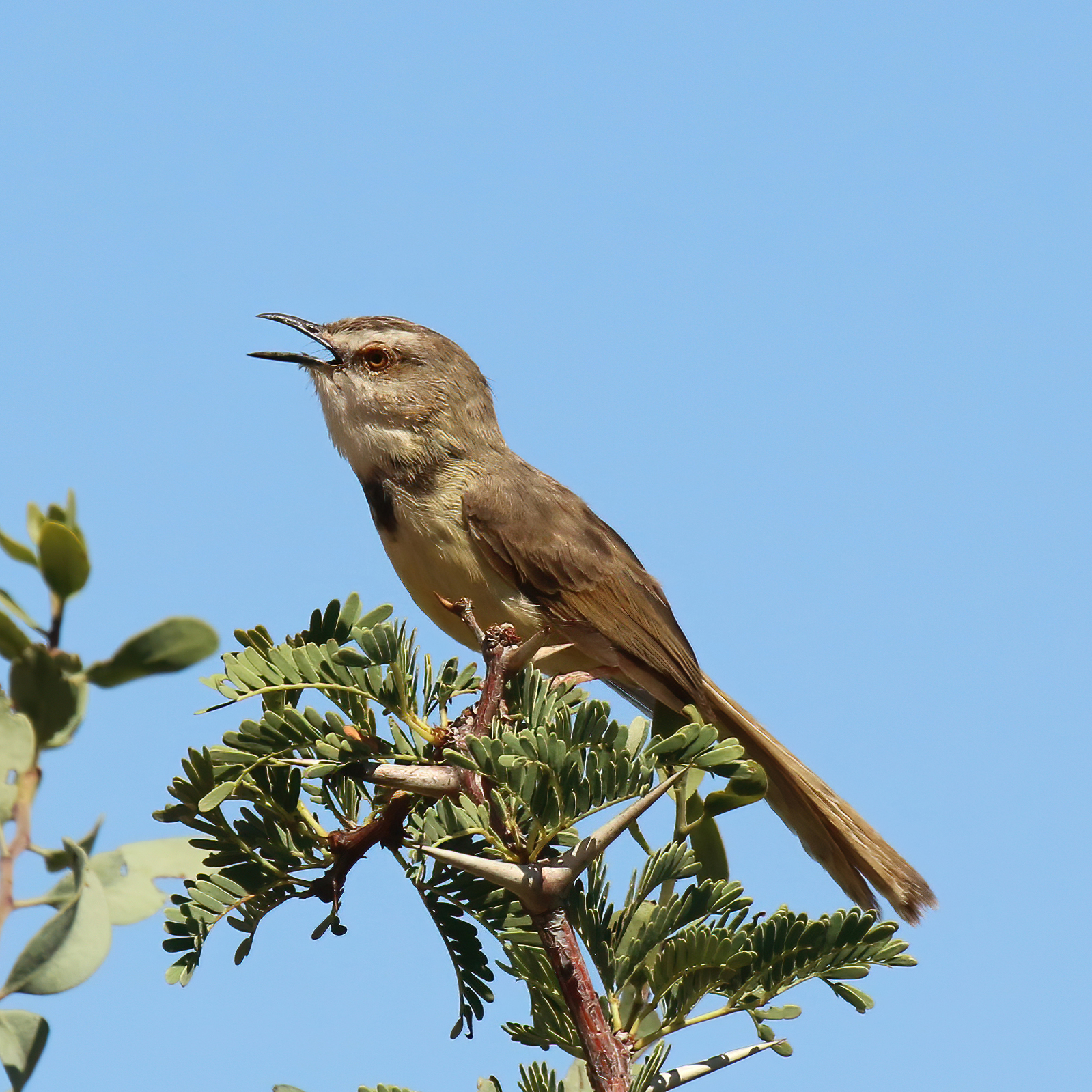
- Breeding female, Tswalu Kalahari Reserve, South Africa

Conservation status
- Least Concern (IUCN 3.1)

Scientific classification
- Kingdom: Animalia
- Phylum: Chordata
- Class: Aves
- Order: Passeriformes
- Family: Cisticolidae
- Genus: Prinia
- Species: P. flavicans

Binomial name
- Prinia flavicans (Vieillot, 1821)

= Black-chested prinia =

Species of bird

The black-chested prinia (Prinia flavicans) is a species of bird in the family Cisticolidae. It is found in Angola, Botswana, Lesotho, Namibia, South Africa, Zambia, and Zimbabwe. Its natural habitat is dry savanna.

Prinias are small warblers that can be distinguished from other warblers by their long tails often held in a near-vertical position. All species are sexually monomorphic. There are four species in the Prinia genus in southern Africa. The three other species are as follows: tawny-flanked prinia (Prinia subflava), Karoo prinia (Prinia maculosa), and Drakensberg prinia (Prinia hypoxantha). Of these four, the black-chested prinia is the only species that has different breeding and non-breeding plumages. The black-chested prinia is aptly named for the charcoal-colored breast band apparent in its breeding plumage.

== Description ==
=== Appearance ===
Black-chested prinias are small, long-tailed warblers whose body sizes range from 13 to 15 centimeters. They are a pale golden-brown on their dorsal side and during the non-breeding season they have pale yellow dorsal plumage. In their alternate plumage (breeding season), they develop a black breast-band and their underparts become white or a buttery yellow.

=== Voice ===
Black-chested prinias make a loud, repeated "chip-chip-chip" call as well as a buzzy sequence of "zrrrt-zrrrt-zrrrt" sounds.

== Distribution and habitat ==
This species is near-endemic to the southern African thornbelt. Black-chested prinias are most abundant in the Kalahari Basin, where their average densities are 0.7 ha per individual. They experience three distinct seasons within their subtropical climate range:

- September – October: very hot, dry spring
- November – May: hot, wet summer
- June – August: cold, dry winter (Herremans).

Along with Acacia habitats, Olea-Buddleia vegetation (within the Cymbopogon-Themeda grassveld) is important in the nesting and feeding habits of black-chested prinia.

== Behavior ==
=== Feeding ===
Like other Prinia, insects make up a majority of black-chested prinias' diet. In a study conducted by Kopij in 2005, small beetles were found to account for one-third of this species' diet. Beetle and weevil larvae, as well as adult flies, comprised much of the birds' stomach contents in Kopij's study. Plant matter like seeds, leaves, and berries are also a non-negligible part of this species' diet. Black-chested prinias have also been observed probing unopened Aloe marlothii flowers in South Africa during the winter season.

=== Breeding ===
Black-chested prinias usually breed during the summer, but their breeding behavior can be erratic due to their dependence on rains. Individuals may take advantage of unseasonal rains during the non-breeding season and breed during the winter.

This species is known to be parasitized by the parasitic weaver (Anomalospiza imberbis). One to two parasitic weaver chicks per clutch have been found to be raised by black-chested prinia parental hosts in Acacia habitats near grasslands.

=== Movement ===
Though black-chested prinias are not thought to be migratory, there is evidence that they may be locally nomadic. Herremans found that black-chested prinias expand their range during severe droughts, becoming a bit nomadic in order to adapt to challenging environmental conditions. Kopij noticed a seasonal decrease in the local populations of black-chested prinias in "inselbergs" (bushy isolated hills within dry grasslands) .

=== Molting ===
Black-chested prinias have a complete biannual molt, meaning that they undergo a complete molt (including flight feathers) twice a year. This species' spring molt (September–November) is a short one of approximately 10 weeks. The autumn molt (February–June, with 95% of adults molting in April) is a longer one of approximately 15 weeks. A complete biannual molt like this one is quite rare in passerines. The evolutionary path of birds with complete biannual cycles is not well understood, though Beltran et al. found that birds following this molting strategy experience strict seasonality in food resources, integument damage, insulation requirements, and camouflage requirements.

This species' molt shows a consistent pattern dependent on season, but the erratic nature of their breeding season results in an occasional overlap of breeding and molting cycles. When molting overlaps with breeding in the autumn, black-chested prinias molt into their alternate plumage (with the black breast-band) even though they are nearing the non-breeding season.
