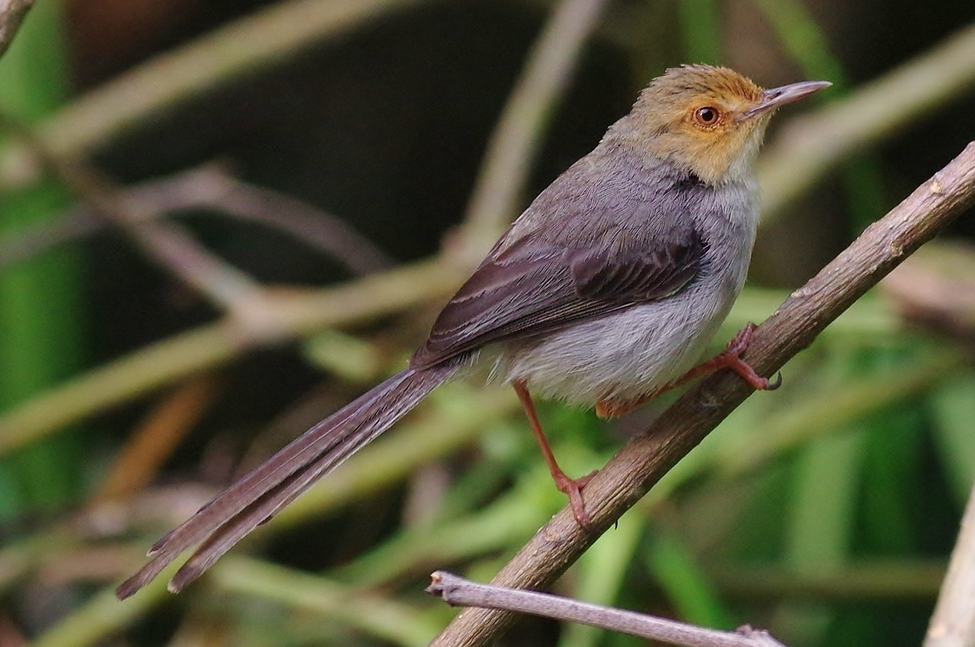

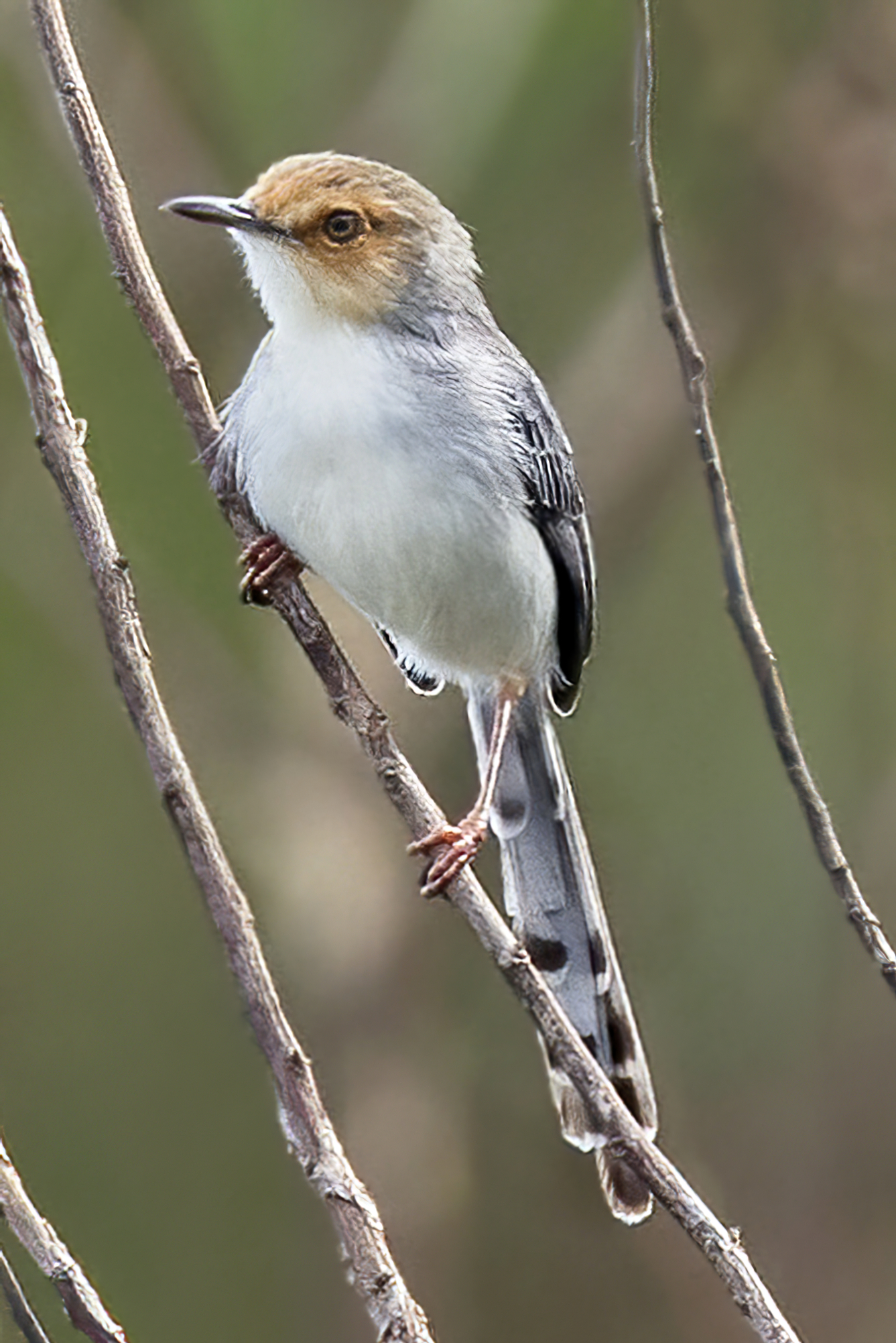
- in São Tomé and Príncipe

Conservation status
- Least Concern (IUCN 3.1)

Scientific classification
- Kingdom: Animalia
- Phylum: Chordata
- Class: Aves
- Order: Passeriformes
- Family: Cisticolidae
- Genus: Prinia
- Species: P. molleri

Binomial name
- Prinia molleri Barboza du Bocage, 1887

= São Tomé prinia =

Species of bird

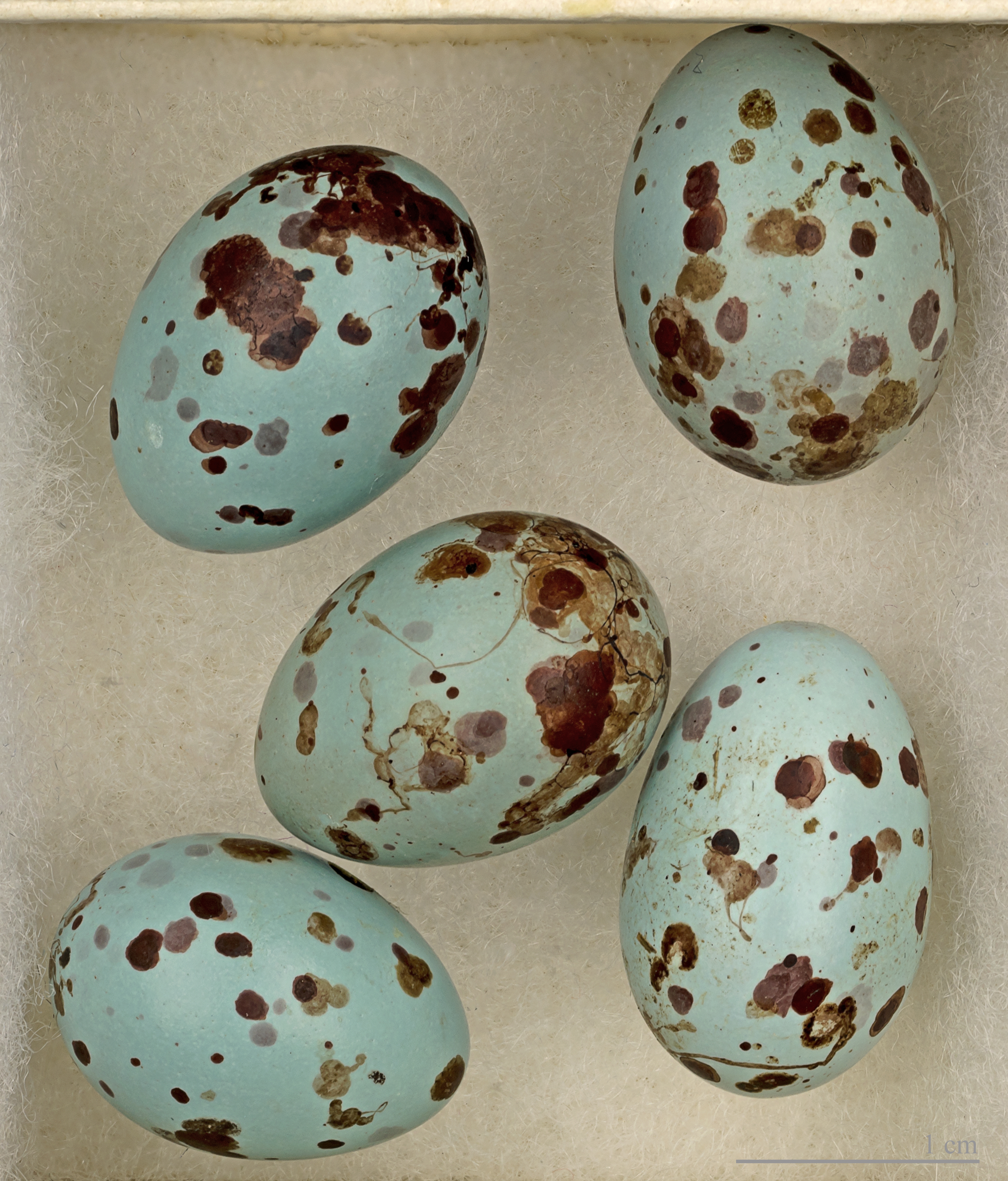
eggs - MHNT

The São Tomé prinia (Prinia molleri) is a species of bird in the family Cisticolidae. It is endemic to São Tomé and Príncipe and is found in the island of São Tomé. Its natural habitats are subtropical or tropical moist montane forest and subtropical or tropical moist shrubland. It is found primarily in open habitats and at the edges of forests.

The species was named by José Vicente Barbosa du Bocage in 1887.

It frequently performs short aerial displays.

== Diet ==
It is primarily insectivorous, but also sometimes eats plants, including Erythrina flowers. It is suspected to forage in rotting tree trunks.
