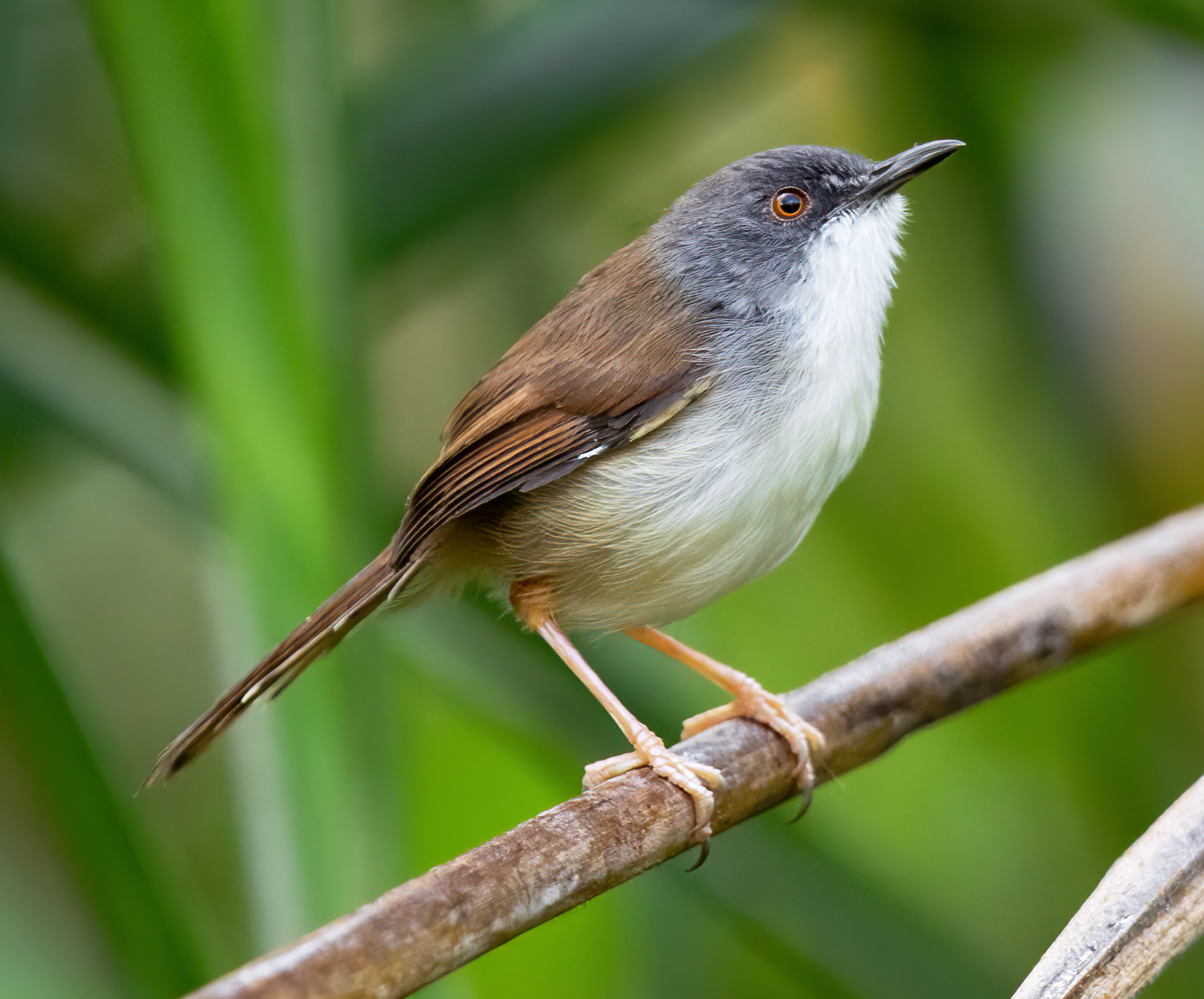

Conservation status
- Least Concern (IUCN 3.1)

Scientific classification
- Kingdom: Animalia
- Phylum: Chordata
- Class: Aves
- Order: Passeriformes
- Family: Cisticolidae
- Genus: Prinia
- Species: P. rufescens

Binomial name
- Prinia rufescens Blyth, 1847

= Rufescent prinia =

Species of bird

The rufescent prinia (Prinia rufescens) is a species of bird in the family Cisticolidae. It is found in Southeast Asia, the Indian subcontinent (mainly in the northeast) and southern Yunnan. Its natural habitat is subtropical or tropical dry forest.

== Subspecies ==
There are currently six recognised subspecies.

- P. r. rufescens, the nominate subspecies, which occurs in east and northeast India, Bhutan, Bangladesh, south China and Myanmar.
- P. r. beavani, which occurs in southeast Myanmar, Thailand, Laos and north Vietnam.
- P. r. peninsularis, which occurs in south Myanmar and south Thailand.
- P. r. objurgans, which occurs in southeast Thailand and Cambodia.
- P. r. extrema, which occurs in south Thailand and Peninsular Malaysia.
- P. r. dalatensis, which occurs in south Vietnam and can be distinguished by the lack of a white loral stripe.
