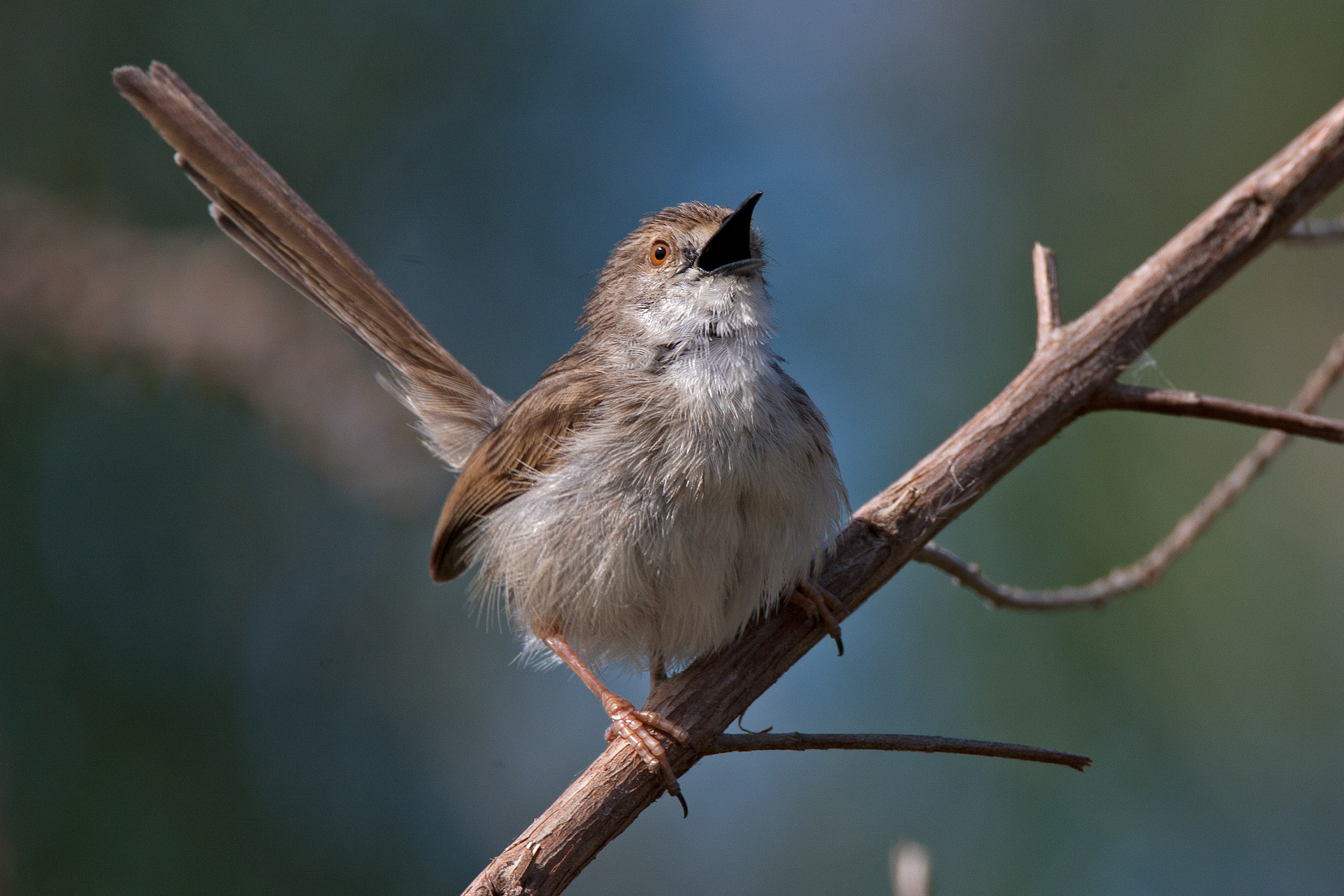

Conservation status
- Least Concern (IUCN 3.1)

Scientific classification
- Kingdom: Animalia
- Phylum: Chordata
- Class: Aves
- Order: Passeriformes
- Family: Cisticolidae
- Genus: Prinia
- Species: P. gracilis

Binomial name
- Prinia gracilis (Lichtenstein, MHC, 1823)

= Graceful prinia =

Species of bird

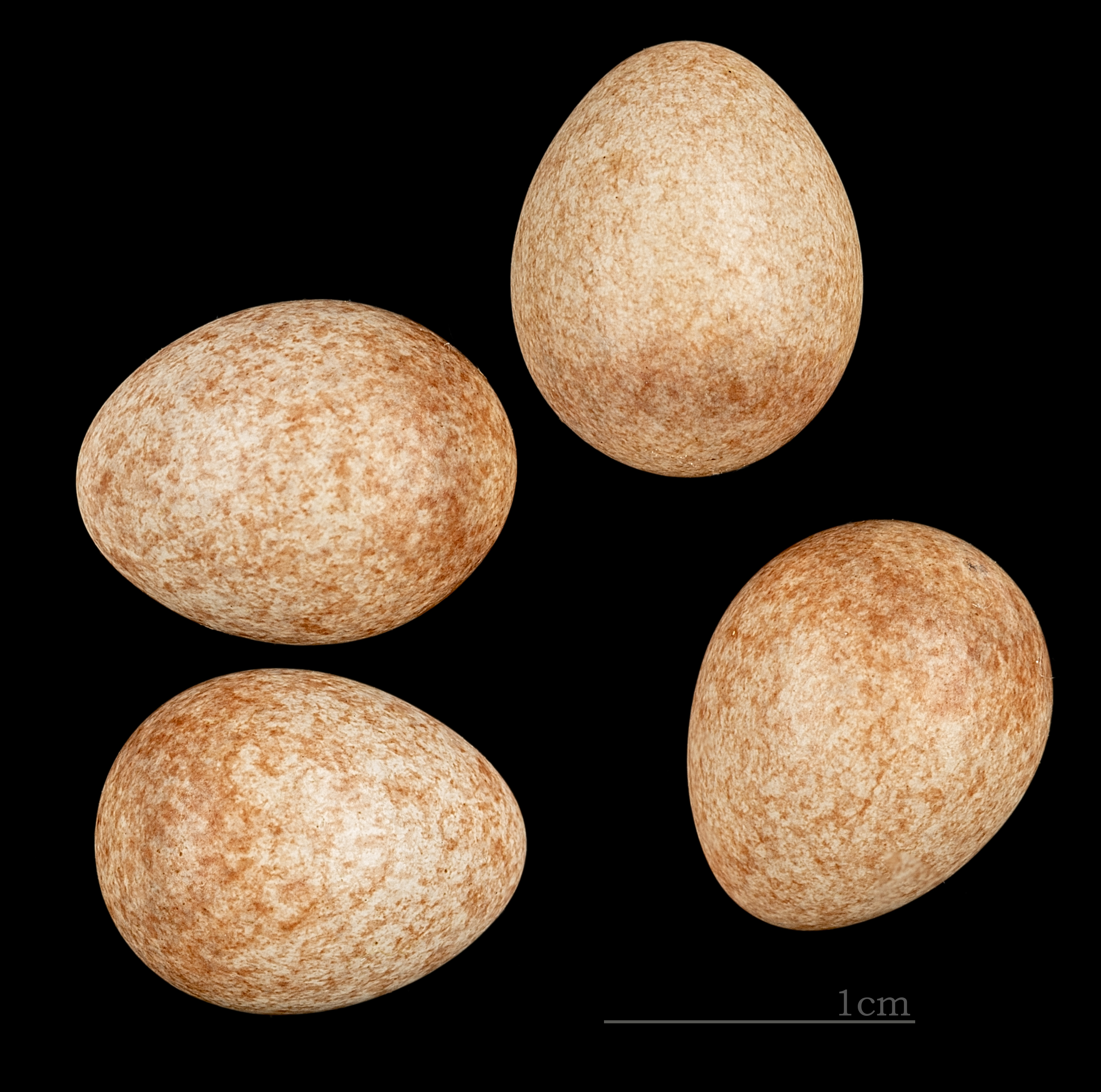
Eggs of Prinia gracilis palaestinae MHNT

The graceful prinia (Prinia gracilis) is a small warbler (in some older works it is referred to as graceful warbler). This prinia is a resident breeder in northeastern Africa (the Nile valley in particular) and southern Asia, from Egypt and Somalia east to Saudi Arabia, where it is sometimes called streaked wren-warbler.

This active passerine bird is typically found in shrub or tall grass in a variety of habitats with thick undergrowth, tamarisks or similar cover. Graceful prinia builds its nest in a bush or grass and lays 3 to 5 eggs.

These 10–11 cm long warblers have short rounded wings, and a long tapering tail with each feather tipped with black and white. In breeding plumage, adults are grey-brown above, with dark streaking. The underparts are whitish with buff flanks, and the bill is short and black.

The sexes are similar. In winter, adults are brighter sandy brown above with weaker streaking, there is more buff on the sides, and the bill is paler.

There are 7 subspecies.

The long tail is often cocked, and the flight of this species is weak. Like most warblers, the graceful prinia is insectivorous. The call is a rolling trilled breep, and the song is a hard rolling repetition of zerlip.

== Taxonomy ==
A study published in 2021 concludes that the graceful prinia should be split from the delicate prinia.

- Prinia gracilis, graceful prinia, 7 subspecies:
  - Prinia gracilis gracilis, River Nile from Egypt to southern Sudan,
  - Prinia gracilis deltae, River Nile delta to western Israel,
  - Prinia gracilis palaestinae, Lebanon to northwestern Saudi Arabia,
  - Prinia gracilis natronensis, Wadi Natron, northern Egypt,
  - Prinia gracilis carlo, Red Sea coast from northeastern Sudan to Somalia,
  - Prinia gracilis yemenensis, western Saudi Arabia, Yemen, southern Oman,
  - Prinia gracilis hufufae, Bahrain, northeastern Saudi Arabia;

The International Ornithological Congress followed this change in an update later that year.
