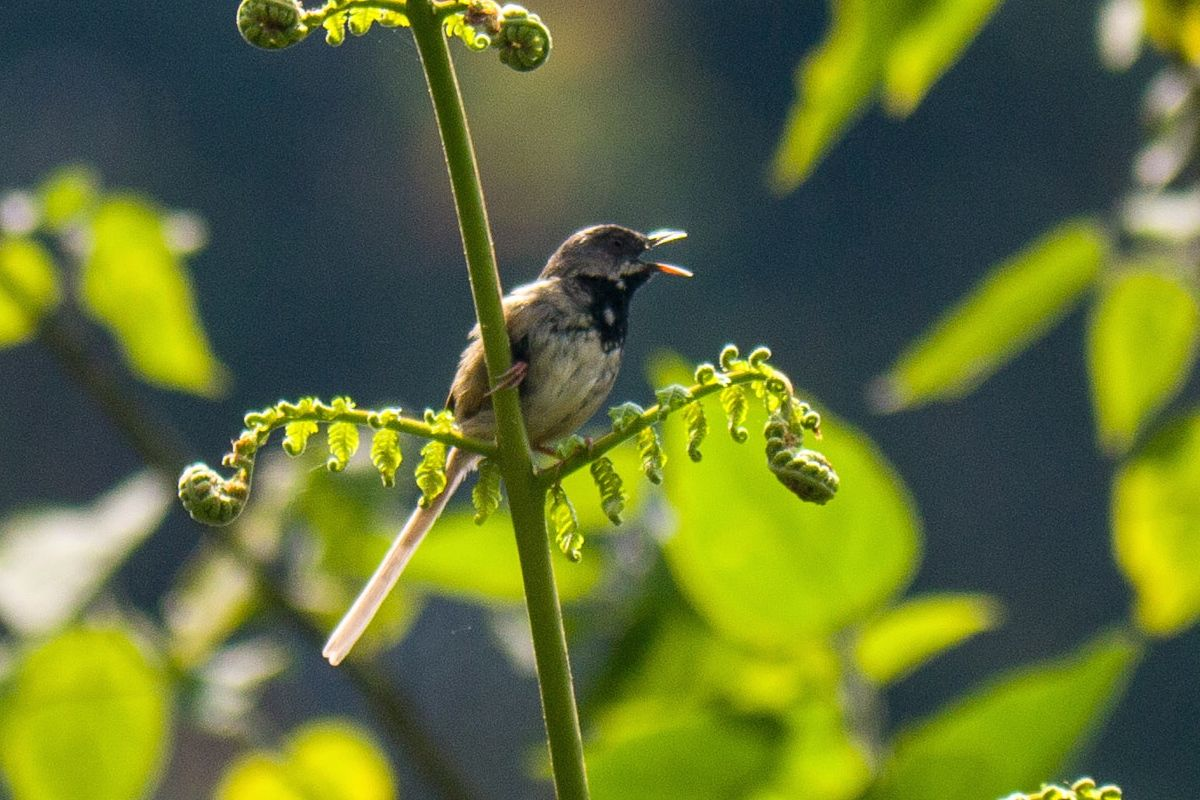
- Mishmi Hills, India

Conservation status
- Least Concern (IUCN 3.1)

Scientific classification
- Kingdom: Animalia
- Phylum: Chordata
- Class: Aves
- Order: Passeriformes
- Family: Cisticolidae
- Genus: Prinia
- Species: P. khasiana

Binomial name
- Prinia khasiana (Godwin-Austen, 1876)

= Rufous-crowned prinia =

Species of bird

The rufous-crowned prinia (Prinia khasiana) is a species of bird in the family Cisticolidae. It is native to Eastern Himalaya.
