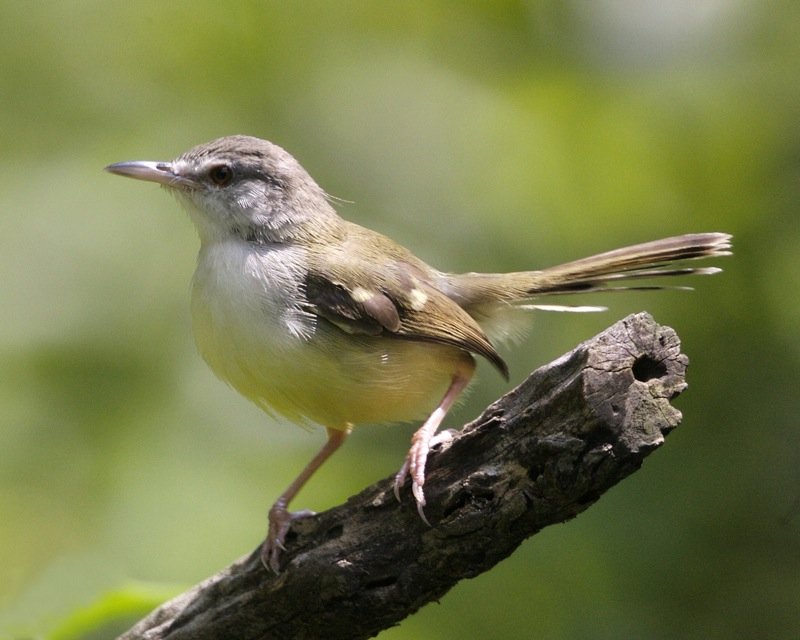
- In Bogor, Java, Indonesia

Conservation status
- Near Threatened (IUCN 3.1)

Scientific classification
- Kingdom: Animalia
- Phylum: Chordata
- Class: Aves
- Order: Passeriformes
- Family: Cisticolidae
- Genus: Prinia
- Species: P. familiaris

Binomial name
- Prinia familiaris Horsfield, 1821

= Bar-winged prinia =

Species of bird

The bar-winged prinia (Prinia familiaris) is a species of bird in the cisticola family Cisticolidae. The species is sometimes known as the bar-winged wren-warbler.

== Description ==
The bar-winged prinia is a distinctive prinia, 13 centimetres (5.1 in) long and weighing 8–10 grams (0.28–0.35 oz).

== Distribution and habitat ==
It is endemic to Indonesia, where it occurs on the islands of Sumatra (where it occurs on the east of the island), Java and Bali. It occupies a wide range of habitats, from mangrove forest at sea level to montane forest, and is tolerant of human modified environments such as gardens, parks and plantations. The presence of humans within its range is common and its willingness to adapt to the subsequent modified landscapes means it is not threatened with extinction.

== Behaviour ==
The bar-winged prinia feeds on insects.
