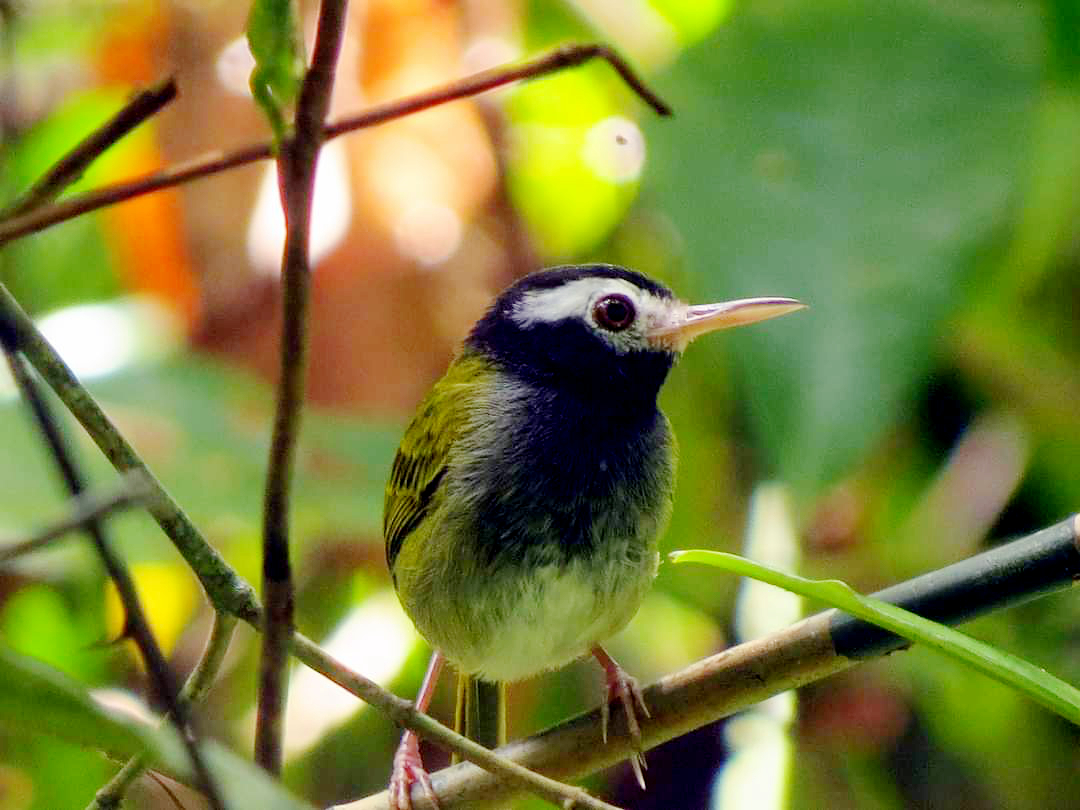

Conservation status
- Least Concern (IUCN 3.1)

Scientific classification
- Kingdom: Animalia
- Phylum: Chordata
- Class: Aves
- Order: Passeriformes
- Family: Cisticolidae
- Genus: Orthotomus
- Species: O. nigriceps

Binomial name
- Orthotomus nigriceps Tweeddale, 1878

Synonyms
- Orthomus nigrogularis Hachisuka, 1943

= Black-headed tailorbird =

Species of songbird

The black-headed tailorbird (Orthotomus nigriceps), also known as the white-browed tailorbird, is a species of songbird in the cisticola family, Cisticolidae. First formally described by the Scottish ornithologist Arthur Hay in 1877, it is endemic to the southeastern Philippines, where it is found on the islands of Mindanao, Dinagat, and Siargao. It inhabits dense undergrowth in lowland forests at elevations of up to 1,000 m (3,300 ft).

Black-headed tailorbirds show three distinct phenotypes, which correspond to different stages of maturity: adults have a 'black' phenotype, immature birds have a 'mottled' phenotype, and juveniles have a 'grey' phenotype. These phenotypes were previously incorrectly thought to be related to differences between the sexes or to represent different species.

The body mass ranges from 8–14 g (0.28–0.49 oz), with an average of 10.3 g (0.36 oz), and is roughly equal in both males and females. The average adult length is 12 cm (4.7 in). Adults have dull black heads, necks, throats, and chests with a prominent white supercilium, line beneath the eye, and chin patch. The lower breast and belly are dull grey, while the upperparts, flanks, and undertail coverts are olive-green, and the tail is darker olive-green. Immature birds have the chin, throat, and upper breast whitish with light grey and black mottling, as well as shorter tails. Juveniles have plain grey chins, throats, and upper breasts.

The species is elusive and most commonly seen in pairs in the undergrowth. It feeds on small invertebrates. Little is known of the species' breeding, but males with enlarged testicles have been seen in March, April, and May. The black-headed tailorbird is listed as being of least concern on the IUCN Red List despite its restricted range due to its presumed stable population. It is usually thought to be uncommon or rare, but this perception may be affected by its retiring nature. No threats to the species are known.

== Taxonomy ==
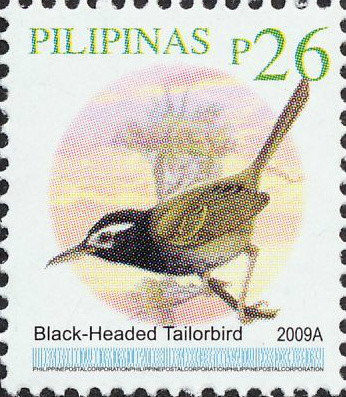
A 2009 Philippine stamp featuring the black-headed tailorbird

The black-headed tailorbird was formally described in 1877 as Orthotomus nigriceps by the Scottish ornithologist Arthur Hay on the basis of a juvenile male specimen from Butuan on the island of Mindanao in the Philippines. In 1943, the Japanese ornithologist Masauji Hachisuka described O. nigrogularis as a new species based on an adult male specimen collected from the eastern Gulf of Davao, Mindanao. This specimen differed from the type of the black-headed tailorbird in having an entirely black throat and upper breast. O. nigrogularis was made a junior synonym of O. nigriceps in 1950 by the American ornithologist Sidney Dillon Ripley; Ripley referred to a 1947 paper by the German-American biologist Ernst Mayr, in which Mayr hypothesized that differences in throat color within the black-headed tailorbird could be attributed to sexual dimorphism. This became the conventional view for the next 70 years, despite Mayr's hypothesis having been made on the basis of a limited number of specimens. In 2022, the American ornithologist Matthew Halley studied a larger number of skins, showing the species was sexually monomorphic. Additionally, he found that specimens from the islands of Dinagat and Siargao differed from those from Mindanao in several characteristics, and described them as the subspecies O. n. luminosus.

The name of the genus is derived from the Ancient Greek orthotomeō, meaning 'to cut straight'. The specific epithet comes from the Modern Latin niger, meaning 'black', and -ceps, meaning '-headed'. Black-headed tailorbird is the official common name designated by the International Ornithologists' Union (IOU); the species is also known as the white-browed tailorbird.

The black-headed tailorbird currently has two subspecies recognized by the IOU, which differ in the color of their bellies, flanks, and tails.

- O. n. nigriceps Tweeddale, 1878: The nominate subspecies, it is found on eastern Mindanao.
- O. n. luminosus Halley, 2022: (Note: The subspecific epithet luminosus is derived from the Latin word luminosus, meaning 'bright', and refers to the "bright ventral plumage" of the subspecies.) Found on Dinagat and Siargao. Has a paler whitish or pale gray belly, brighter yellow flanks, more yellow undertail, and olive-green uppertail.

The black-headed tailorbird is one of 13 species in the tailorbird genus Orthotomus. It has historically sometimes been considered to be the same species as the yellow-breasted and white-eared tailorbirds due to similarities in their vocalisations; however, these three species are genetically distinct, although they form a superspecies. According to a 2012 study of genetic data, the black-headed tailorbird is sister (most closely related) to the white-eared tailorbird, and these two species are further sister to the yellow-breasted tailorbird.

== Description ==
Black-headed tailorbirds are dark tailorbirds with a characteristic head pattern. The body mass ranges from 8–14 g (0.28–0.49 oz), with an average of 10.3 g (0.36 oz), and is roughly equal in both males and females. Older sources erroneously state the mean body mass as being 7 g (0.25 oz). Birds from Mindanao have a lower average body mass, 10.1 g (0.36 oz), than birds from Dinagat and Siargao, who have an average body mass of 10.6 g (0.37 oz). The average adult length is 12 cm (4.7 in). In O. n. nigriceps, the average wing length is 48.3 mm (1.90 in), the mean bill length is 10.8 mm (0.43 in), and the average tail length is 46.3 mm (1.82 in). In O. n. luminosus, the average wing length is 50.8–51.8 mm (2.00–2.04 in), the mean bill length is 10.8–10.9 mm (0.43–0.43 in), and the average tail length is 45.8–46.0 mm (1.80–1.81 in).

Black-headed tailorbirds show three distinct phenotypes, which correspond to different stages of maturity: adults have a 'black phenotype', immatures have a 'mottled phenotype', and juveniles have a 'grey phenotype'. Adults have dull black heads, necks, throats, and chests with a prominent white supercilium, line beneath the eye, and chin patch, although the chin patch is inconsistent and can sometimes be absent. Some adults have a small number of white feathers on the chin or abdomen retained from their immature plumage. The black blends into dull grey on the lower breast and belly, the latter having faint whitish tips to the feathers. The upperparts, flanks, and undertail coverts are olive-green and the tail is darker olive-green. The feathers of the wings are blackish with green edges; the region around the carpals is yellow and the median and greater upperwing coverts have brighter yellowish edges. The iris is chestnut-brown, the legs are pale pink, and upper and lower mandibles of the bill are blackish and whitish, respectively. Immature birds have the chin, throat, and upper breast whitish with light grey and black mottling, as well as a shorter tail with an average length of 38.5–41 mm (1.52–1.61 in). Juveniles have plain grey chins, throats, and upper breasts.

The species can be told apart from the white-eared tailorbird by its white supercilium, the absence of a white ear-spot, and its paler legs.

=== Vocalizations ===
The tailorbird's call is a series of lengthy, stuttering trills that slows as it flattens out. It is like the song of the yellow-breasted tailorbird, but has a more "metallic ringing quality". Other calls include an anxious, falling ssiirrrrpppppp and a ringing key-e ei, the second of which is similar to the long-tailed bush warbler's song.

== Distribution and habitat ==
The black-headed tailorbird is endemic to the southeastern Philippines, where it is found on the islands of Mindanao, Dinagat, and Siargao. On Mindanao, it is known from Agusan, Surigao, and eastern Davao. It inhabits dense undergrowth in lowland forests at elevations of up to 1,000 m (3,300 ft) and is non-migratory. A 2021 study of avian biodiversity near Mount Pantaron in Bukidnon found that the black-headed tailorbird, like other Philippine endemics, was absent from agricultural ecosystems but present in nearby montane forests. This suggests that the species may avoid habitats affected by human activities.

== Ecology and conservation ==
The species is elusive and reclusive, most commonly being seen in pairs in the undergrowth and seldom in the open. It feeds on small invertebrates. Males with enlarged testicles have been seen in March, April, and May; nothing else is known of its breeding.

The black-headed tailorbird is listed as being of least concern on the IUCN Red List despite its restricted range, due to its presumed stable population. It is usually thought to be uncommon or rare, but this perception may be affected by its retiring nature. The species was reported as being "quite common" on Siargao and Dinagat in 1973. It inhabits the Mindanao and the Eastern Visayas Endemic Bird Area; no threats to the species are known.
