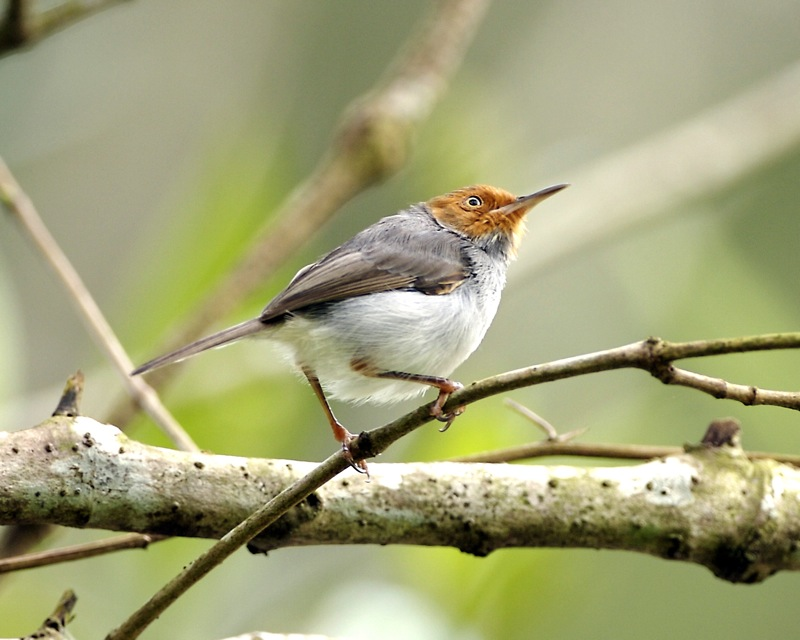

Conservation status
- Least Concern (IUCN 3.1)

Scientific classification
- Kingdom: Animalia
- Phylum: Chordata
- Class: Aves
- Order: Passeriformes
- Family: Cisticolidae
- Genus: Orthotomus
- Species: O. ruficeps

Binomial name
- Orthotomus ruficeps (Lesson, 1830)

= Ashy tailorbird =

Species of bird

The ashy tailorbird (Orthotomus ruficeps) is a species of songbird from Southeast Asia, formerly placed in the "Old World warbler" assemblage, it but now placed in the family Cisticolidae.

== Taxonomy ==
The ashy tailorbird was described by the French ornithologist René Lesson in 1830. It was once treated as being conspecific (the same species) as the olive-backed tailorbird, but the two species are genetically distinct and act as such where their range overlaps in Java. Nine subspecies have been described.

== Distribution and habitat ==
The species is found across Southeast Asia, ranging from southern Myanmar and southern Thailand through the Malay Peninsula and Singapore. It is found widely across Greater Sunda Islands, namely Borneo, Sumatra and Java, as well as smaller islands near these, including the Philippine island of Mapun (which is close to Borneo). Another disjunct population is found in southern Vietnam and Cambodia.

Its natural habitats is typically lowland forests close to the coast, but it has been recorded up to 900 m (3,000 ft) on Sumatra and Borneo. It can occupy a range of forested habitats including mangrove forest, secondary forest, swamp forest and scrubland. On inshore and offshore islands, it typically lives in more open habitats.

== Description ==
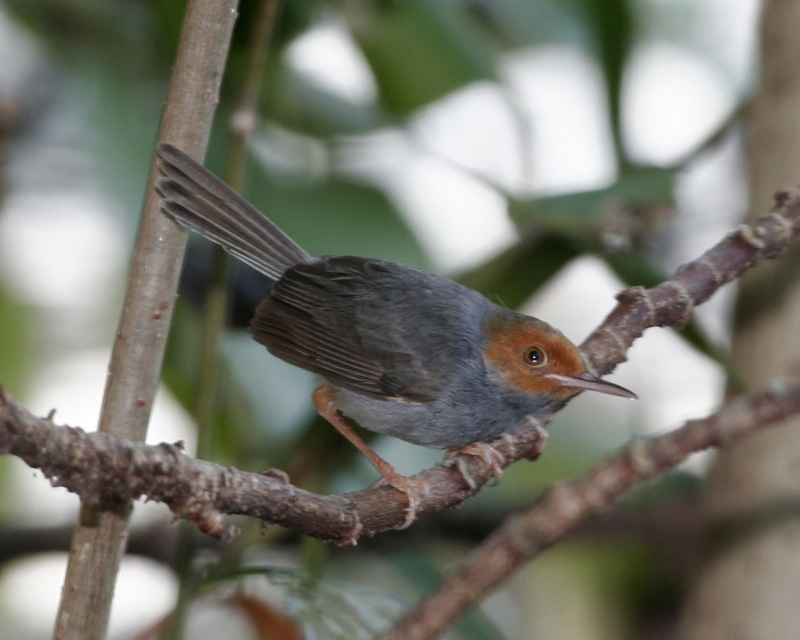
A male ashy tailorbird

The ashy tailorbird is a small songbird, measuring 7 cm (2.8 in) in length and weighing 12 g (0.42 oz). The bill, which is bark brown above and horn coloured below, is long and slightly decurved at the tip. The plumage varies by sex, with the male having a rufous-chestnut face, chin and forecrown, an ashy grey back, upper wing and throat, from the throat down the breast to the belly the grey becomes lighter until it is almost white on the belly. The tail is lighter grey. The female is similar but with a white chin and throat, a pale grey wash across the breast, and has paler upperparts. Juvenile birds lack red on the head and olive-green upperparts. The subspecies vary in the redness of the head and shade of grey on the back.

== Behaviour ==
The ashy tailorbird is found foraging in pairs and small family groups. It will feed in both the canopy of forests and the undergrowth, as well as the forest edge. It is an insectivore, and has been recorded taking ants, caterpillars, flies and beetles.

Like other tailorbirds, the ashy tailorbird builds a nest by stitching together the two sides of a large leaf, pushing holes through the edges and using plant fibers or spiderweb tie them together. The nesting site is usually low down, no more than 1 m (3.3 ft) off the ground, and the clutch size is two to three eggs. The species is targeted by at least one brood parasite, the plaintive cuckoo, but it is likely other species of cuckoo also target the ashy tailorbird.

== Relationship with humans ==
The ashy tailorbird has a wide distribution with no evidence of any declines, and as such has been evaluated as least concern by the International Union for Conservation of Nature. The species has adapted well to the widespread conversion of rainforest into palm oil plantations, being one of the more common species found in one study. In these plantations its diet has adapted to taking a species of weevil, Elaeidobius kamerunicus, an introduced pollinator of the oil palm tree, and concerns have been raised that they may reduce the productivity of the crop.
