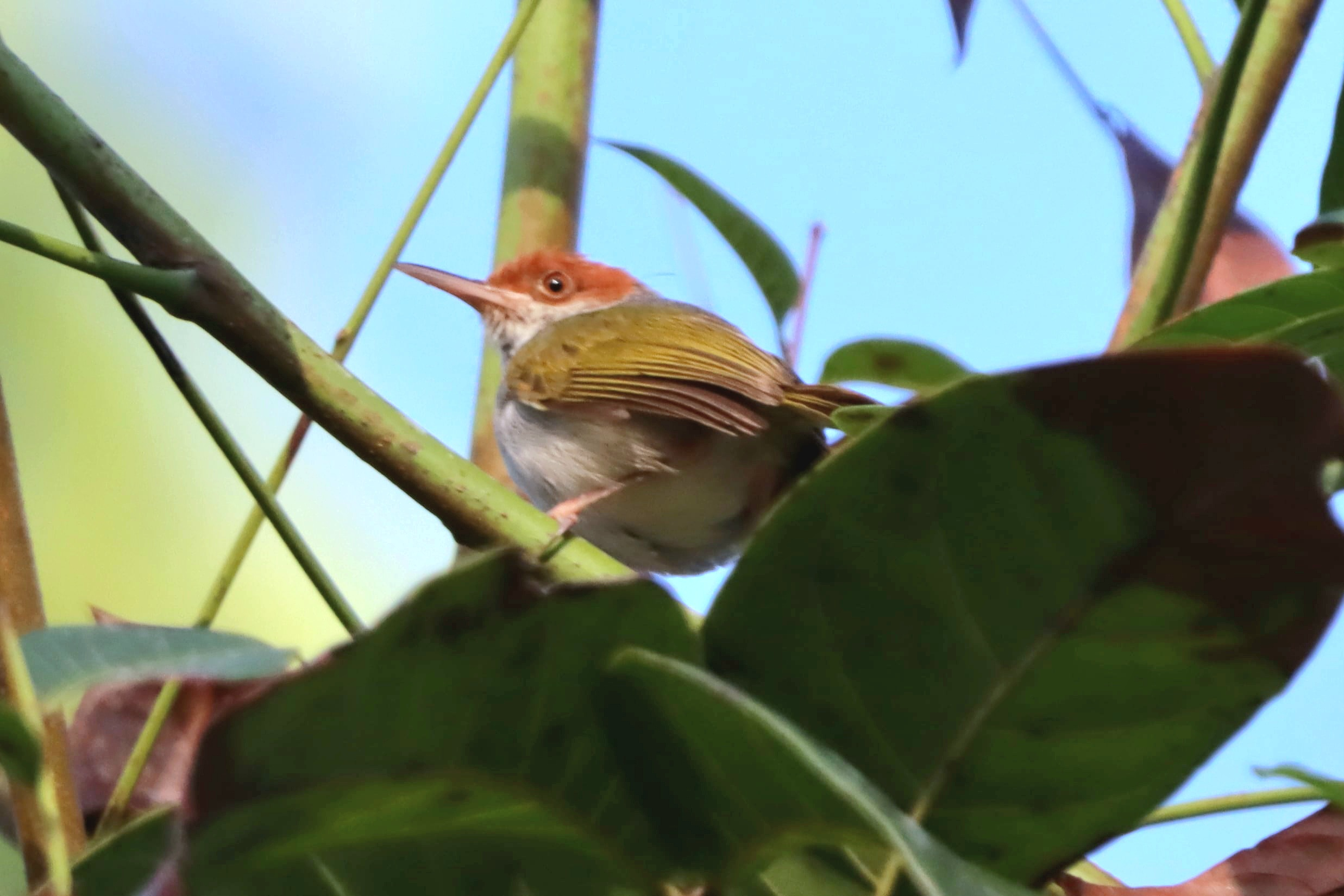

Conservation status
- Least Concern (IUCN 3.1)

Scientific classification
- Kingdom: Animalia
- Phylum: Chordata
- Class: Aves
- Order: Passeriformes
- Family: Cisticolidae
- Genus: Orthotomus
- Species: O. castaneiceps

Binomial name
- Orthotomus castaneiceps Walden, 1872

= Visayan tailorbird =

Species of bird

The Visayan tailorbird (Orthotomus castaneiceps), also known as the Philippine tailorbird or the chestnut-crowned tailorbird, is a species of bird formerly placed in the "Old World warbler" assemblage, but now placed in the family Cisticolidae. It is native to the Philippines in Western Visayas. Its natural habitats are tropical moist lowland forests, tropical mangrove forests and secondary growth.

== Description ==
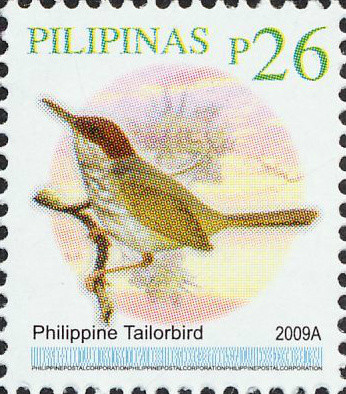
A 2009 Philippine stamp featuring the Visayan tailorbird

It was formerly conspecific with trilling tailorbird.

It is presumed to eat insects and it is typically found in dense tangled undergrowth.

=== Subspecies ===
Two subspecies are recognized:

- O. c. castaneiceps Walden, 1872 – found on Bantayan Island, Panay (and proximate islands), Masbate and Ticao Island
- O. c. rabori Parkes, 1961 – found on Negros and possibly Cebu

== Ecology and behavior ==
It is known to feed on small invertebrates and is usually seen foraging in dense undergrowth, typically in pairs.

The breeding season is believed to be at least from March to May. Their nest is typically placed 2 to 10 meters above the ground on the tip of a branch or leaf of a fern. Like all tailorbirds, the nest is complex and sown together to form a pouch. Two to three eggs are laid.

== Habitat and conservation status ==
It lives in lowland forest edges and clearings and also agricultural land and in secondary growth with tangled undergrowth. They are found mostly below 600 meters above sea level.

IUCN Red List has assessed this as being of least concern as it is tolerant of, if not more suited to, degraded habitat.
