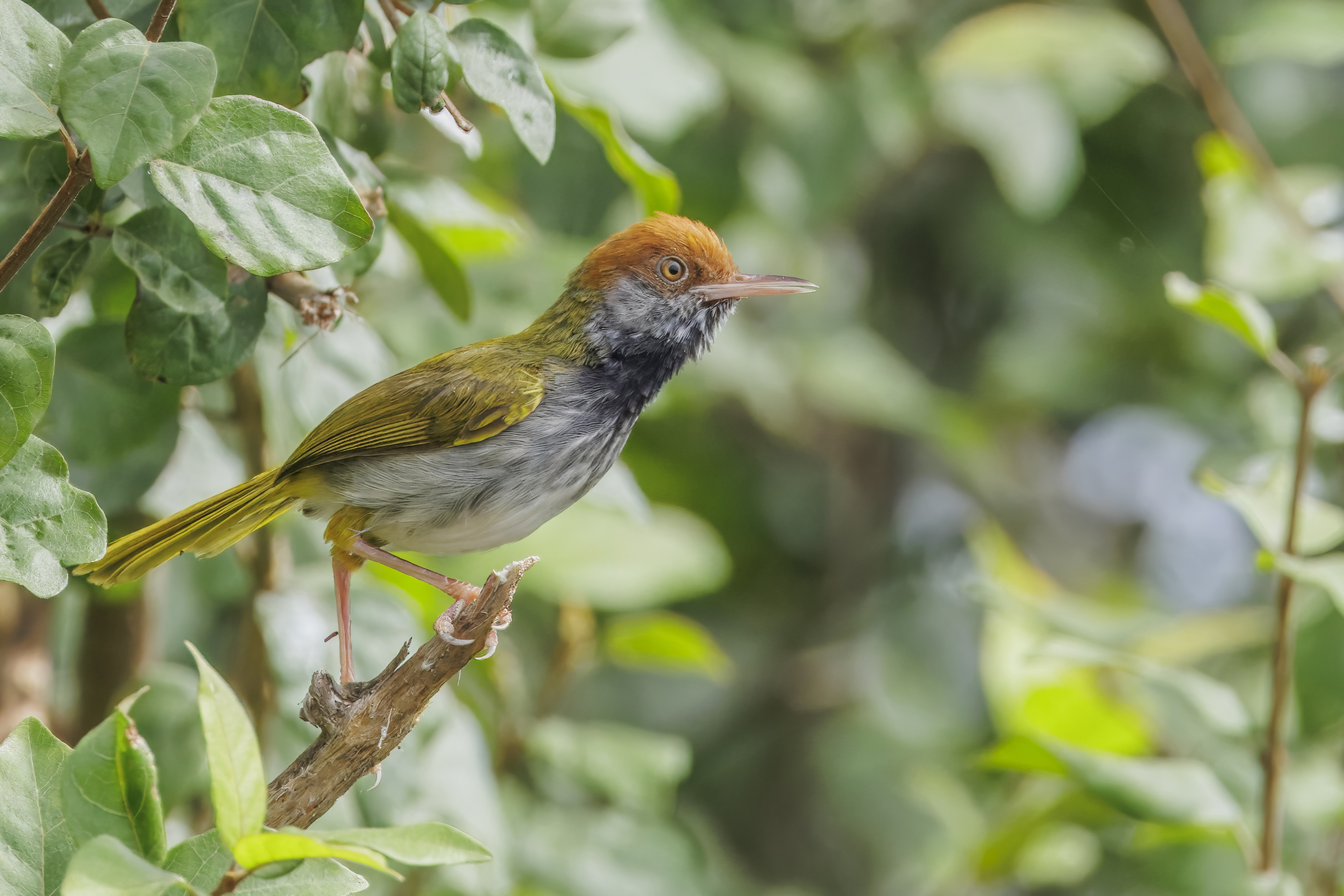
- Male
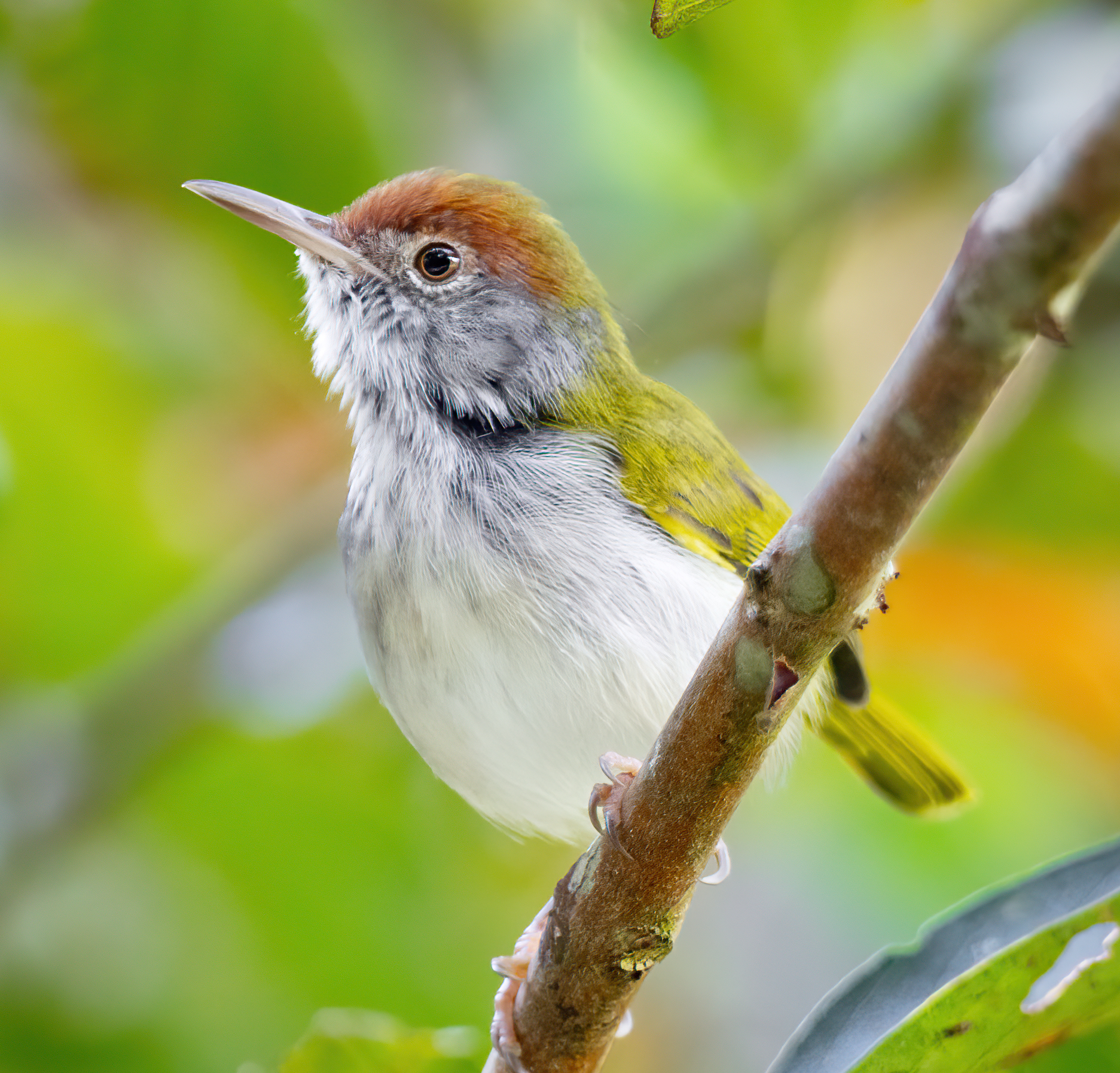

Conservation status
- Least Concern (IUCN 3.1)

Scientific classification
- Kingdom: Animalia
- Phylum: Chordata
- Class: Aves
- Order: Passeriformes
- Family: Cisticolidae
- Genus: Orthotomus
- Species: O. atrogularis

Binomial name
- Orthotomus atrogularis Temminck, 1836

= Dark-necked tailorbird =

Species of bird

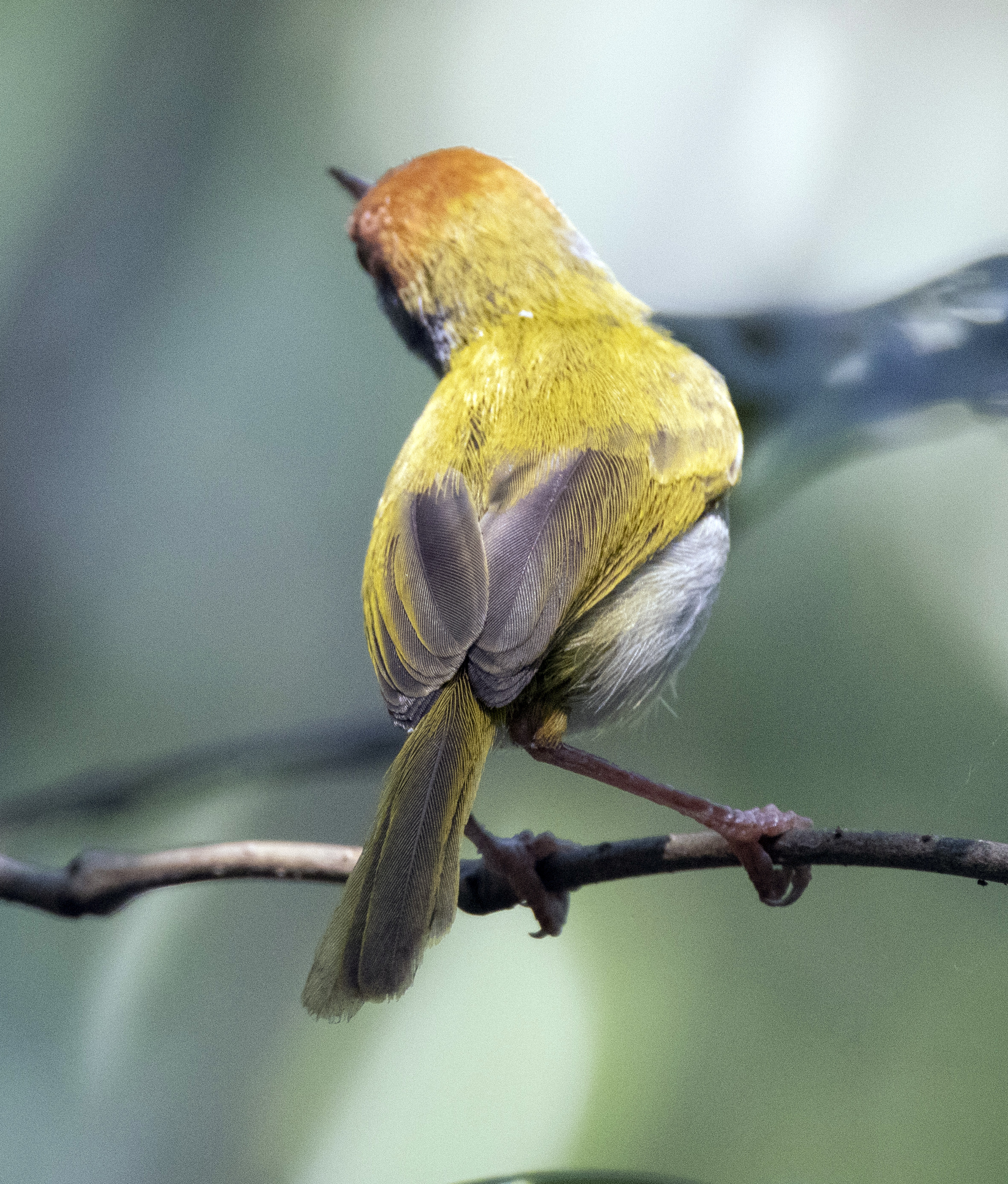
Dark-necked tailorbird, Thailand

The dark-necked tailorbird (Orthotomus atrogularis) is a songbird species. Formerly placed in the "Old World warbler" assemblage, it is now placed in the family Cisticolidae.

It is found in Bangladesh, Northeast India and Southeast Asia. Its natural habitats are subtropical or tropical moist lowland forest and subtropical or tropical mangrove forest.

It is often kept as a pet.
