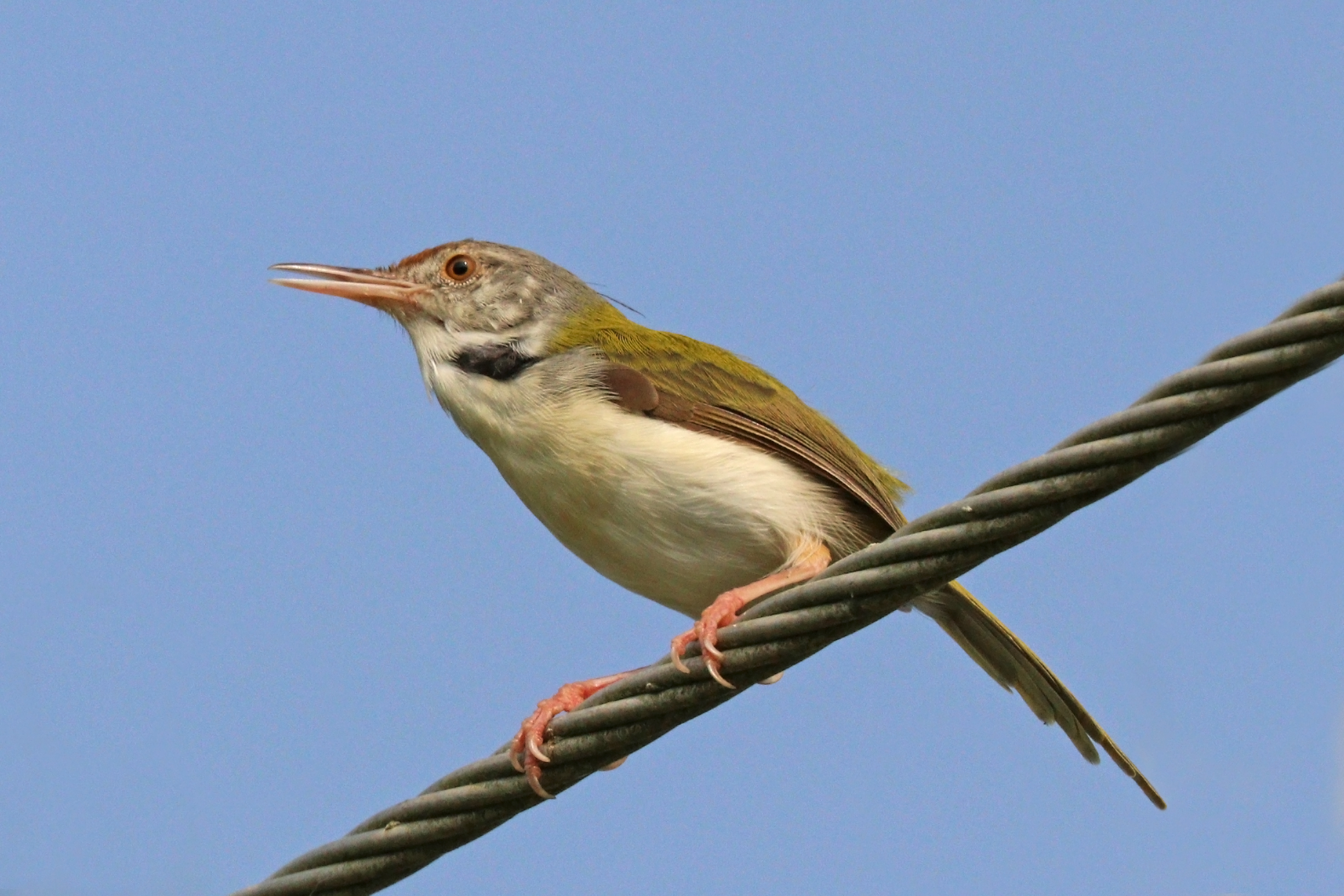
- Male
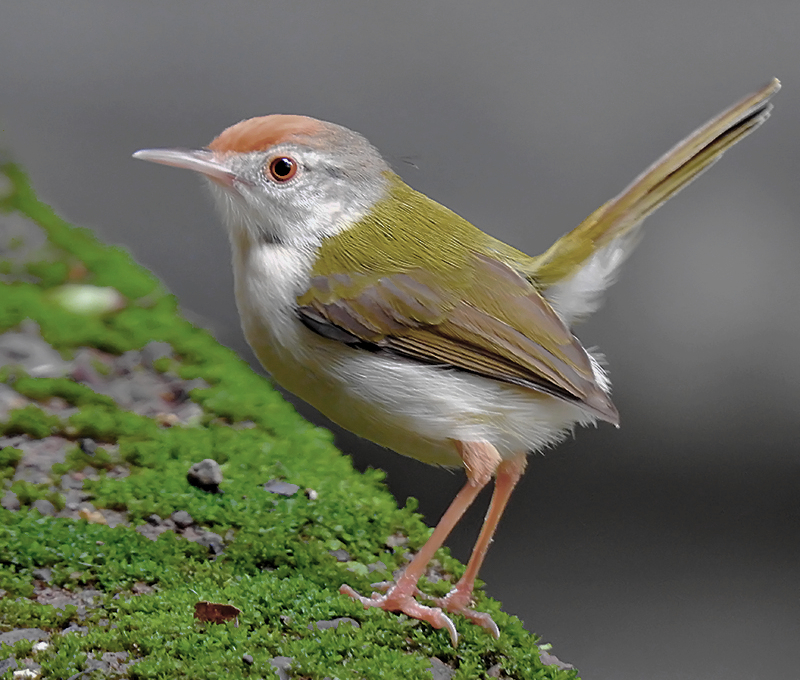
- Female Rapid Calls Slow Calls

Conservation status
- Least Concern (IUCN 3.1)

Scientific classification
- Kingdom: Animalia
- Phylum: Chordata
- Class: Aves
- Order: Passeriformes
- Family: Cisticolidae
- Genus: Orthotomus
- Species: O. sutorius

Binomial name
- Orthotomus sutorius (Pennant, 1769)

Subspecies
- O. s. sutorius (Pennant, 1769); O. s. fernandonis (Whistler, 1939); O. s. guzuratus (Latham, 1790); O. s. patia Hodgson, 1845; O. s. luteus Ripley, 1948; O. s. inexpectatus La Touche, 1922; O. s. maculicollis F. Moore, 1855; O. s. longicauda (J. F. Gmelin, 1789); O. s. edela Temminck, 1836

= Common tailorbird =

Species of bird

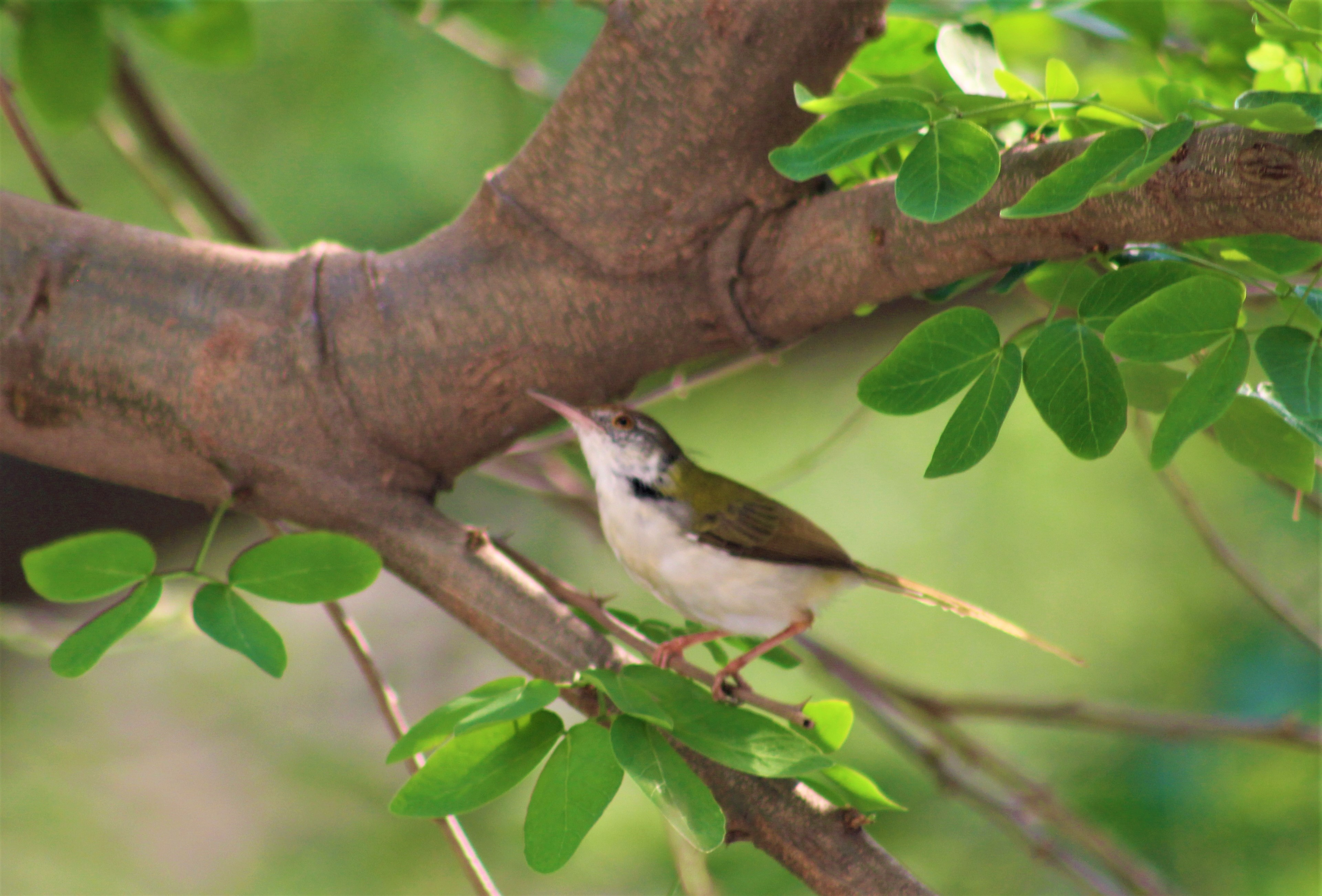
Male tailorbird

The common tailorbird (Orthotomus sutorius) is a songbird found across tropical and subtropical Asia. Popular for its nest made of leaves "sewn" together and immortalized by Rudyard Kipling as Darzee in his Jungle Book, it is a common resident in urban gardens. Although shy birds that are usually hidden within vegetation, their loud calls are familiar and give away their presence. They are distinctive in having a long upright tail, greenish upper body plumage and rust coloured forehead and crown. This passerine bird is typically found in open farmland, scrub, forest edges and gardens. Tailorbirds get their name from the way their nest is constructed. The edges of a large leaf are pierced and sewn together with plant fibre or spider silk to make a cradle in which the actual nest is built.

== Taxonomy and systematics ==
The scientific name sutorius means "cobbler" rather than "tailor" while Orthotomus means "straight-cutting".

The species was earlier placed in the family Sylviidae but more recent molecular studies place the species within the family Cisticolidae, along with Prinia and Cisticola.

A number of subspecies are recognized within its widespread range in South Asia and Southeast Asia.

- O.s. sutorius: Sri Lanka
- O.s. fernandonis: Sri Lanka
- O.s. guzuratus: Indian peninsula, West to Pakistan
- O.s. patia: The Terai of Nepal along the Himalayan foothills until Myanmar. A small population of O. s. patia is also found in the northern Eastern Ghats (Wangasara).
- O.s. luteus: Hills of Northeast India
- O.s. inexpectatus and O.s. maculicollis: Thailand, Laos and Vietnam, Malaysia, Cambodia and Vietnam
- O. s. inexpectatus and O. s. maculicollis: South east China, including the island of Hainan
- O. s. longicauda: Tonkin in Vietnam
- O. s. edela: Java

== Description ==
The common tailorbird is a brightly coloured bird, with bright green upperparts and creamy underparts. They range in size from 10 to 14 centimetres (3.9 to 5.5 in) and weigh 6 to 10 grams (0.21 to 0.35 oz). They have short rounded wings, a long tail, strong legs and a sharp bill with curved tip to the upper mandible. They are wren-like with a long upright tail that is often moved around. The crown is rufous and the upperparts are predominantly olive green. The underside is creamy white. The sexes are identical, except that the male has long central tail feathers in the breeding season, although the reliability of sexing data accompanying museum specimens used in determining this sexual dimorphism has been questioned. Young birds are duller. When calling, the dark patches on the sides of the neck become visible. These are due to the dark pigmented and bare skin that are present in both sexes and sometimes give the appearance of a dark gorget.

== Behaviour and ecology ==
Like most warblers, the common tailorbird is insectivorous. The song is a loud cheeup-cheeup-cheeup with variations across the populations. The disyllabic calls are repeated often. Tailorbirds are found singly or in pairs, usually low in the undergrowth or trees, sometimes hopping on the ground. They forage for insects and have been known to feed on a range of beetles and bugs. They are attracted to insects at flowers and are known to favour the inflorescences of mango. They also visit flowers such as those of Bombax, Salmalia for nectar and are sometimes covered in pollen, giving them a golden-headed appearance.

The birds roost alone during the non-breeding season but may roost side-by-side during the breeding season, sometimes with the newly fledged juvenile sandwiched between the adults. The roost sites chosen are thin twigs on trees with cover above them and were often close to human habitation and lights.

=== Breeding ===
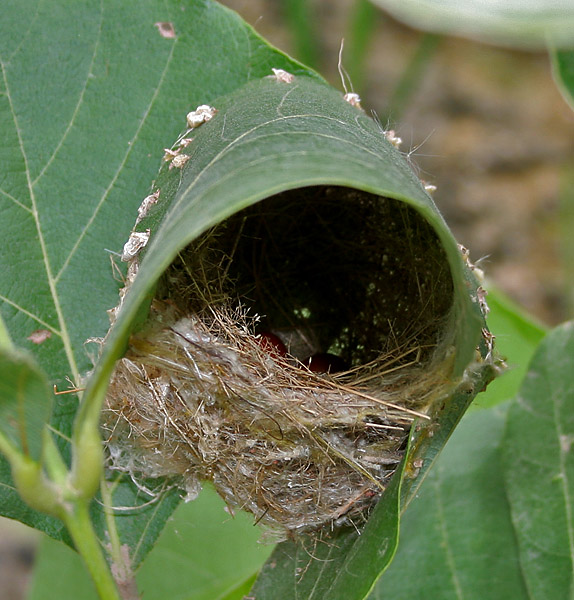
Nest showing the rivets

The breeding season is March to December peaking from June to August in India, coinciding with the wet season. In Sri Lanka the main breeding periods are March to May and August to September, although they can breed throughout the year.

Although the name is derived from their nest construction habit, the nest is not unique and is also found in many Prinia warblers. The nest is a deep cup, lined with soft materials and placed in thick foliage and the leaves holding the nest have the upper surfaces outwards making it difficult to spot. The punctures made on the edge of the leaves are minute and do not cause browning of the leaves, further aiding camouflage. The nest lining of a nest in Sri Lanka that was studied by Casey Wood was found to be lined with lint from Euphorbia, Ceiba pentandra and Bombax malabaricum species. Jerdon wrote that the bird made knots, however no knots are used. Wood classified the processes used by the tailorbird in nest as sewing, rivetting, lacing and matting. In some cases the nest is made from a single large leaf, the margins of which are rivetted together. Sometimes the fibres from one rivet are extended into an adjoining puncture and appearing more like sewing. The stitch is made by piercing two leaves and drawing fibre through them. The fibres fluff out on the outside and in effect they are more like rivets. There are many variations in the nest and some may altogether lack the cradle of leaves. One observer noted that the birds did not utilize cotton that was made available while another observer, Edward Hamilton Aitken, was able to induce them to use artificially supplied cotton. The usual clutch is three eggs.

The incubation period is about 12 days. Both male and female feed the young. Mortality of eggs and chicks is high due to predation by rodents, cats, crow-pheasants, lizards and other predators. The young birds fledge in about 14 days. The female alone incubates according to some sources, while others suggest that both sexes incubate; however, both parents take part in feeding and sanitation. The males are said to feed the incubating female. An unusual case of a pair of tailorbirds adopting chicks in an artificially translocated nest belonging to a different pair has been recorded. Nests are sometimes parasitized by the Plaintive Cuckoo (Cacomantis merulinus).

== In culture ==
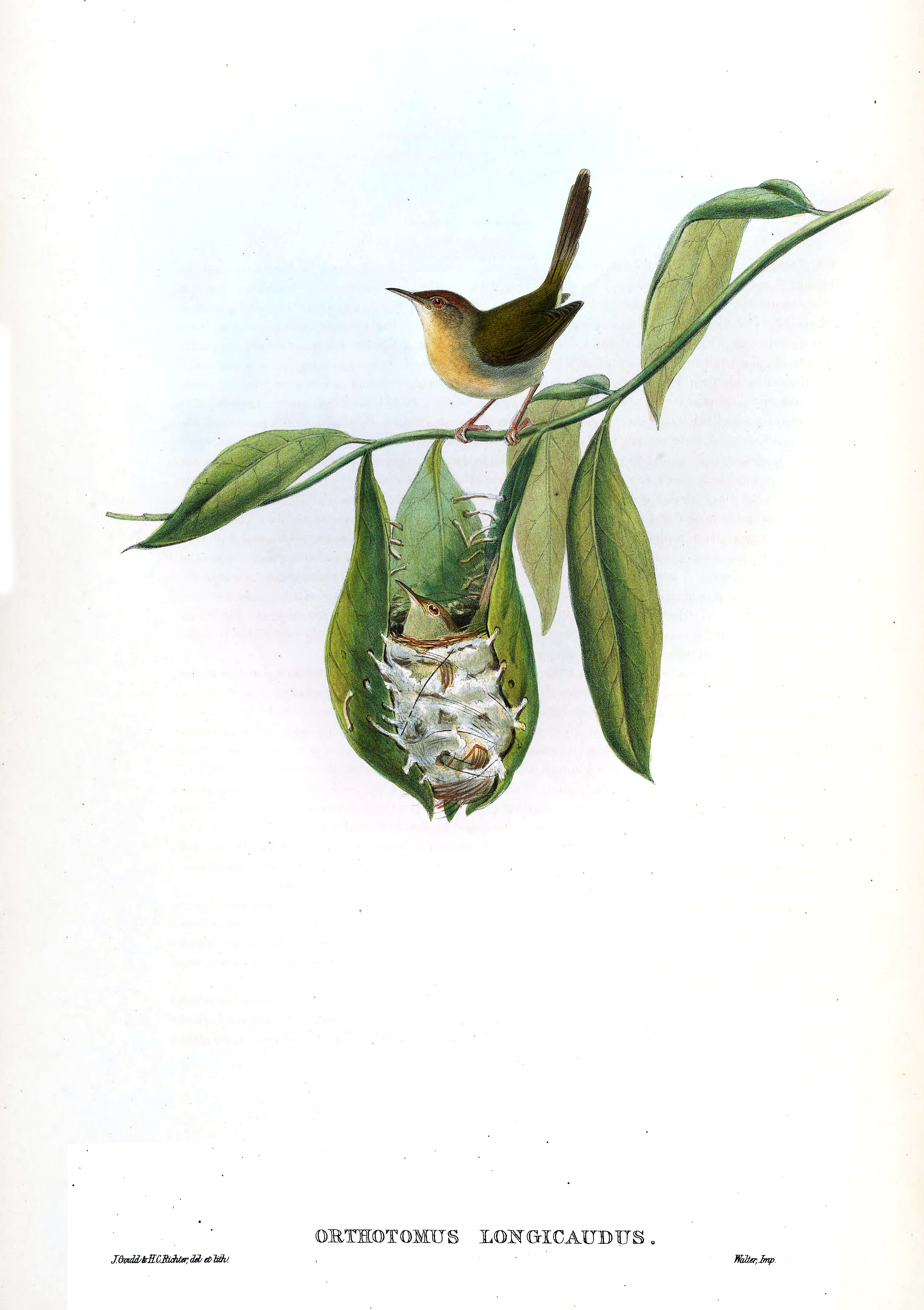
John Gould's engraving for Birds of Asia

"Rikki-Tikki-Tavi", one of Rudyard Kipling's Jungle Book stories, includes a tailorbird couple, Darzee (which means "tailor" in Urdu and Hindi) and his wife, as two of the key characters. Darzee's wife is said to have feigned injury, but this behaviour is unknown in this species. A classic book of children's folk tales in Bengali by Upendrakishore Ray is titled "Tuntunir Boi", after the local name for the species, tuntuni.

== Gallery ==
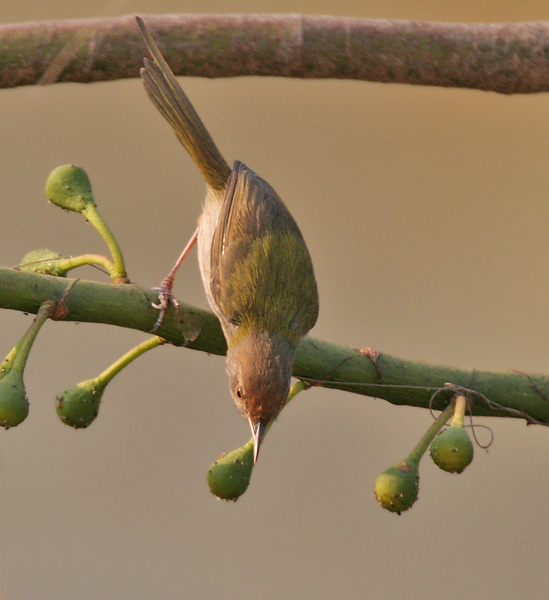
Foraging for insects in Kolkata, West Bengal, India

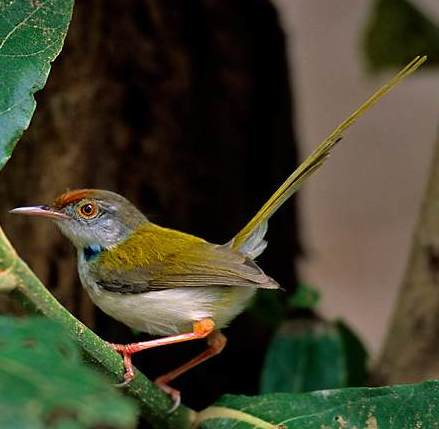
Male of subspecies O. s. guzuratus with elongated central tail feathers

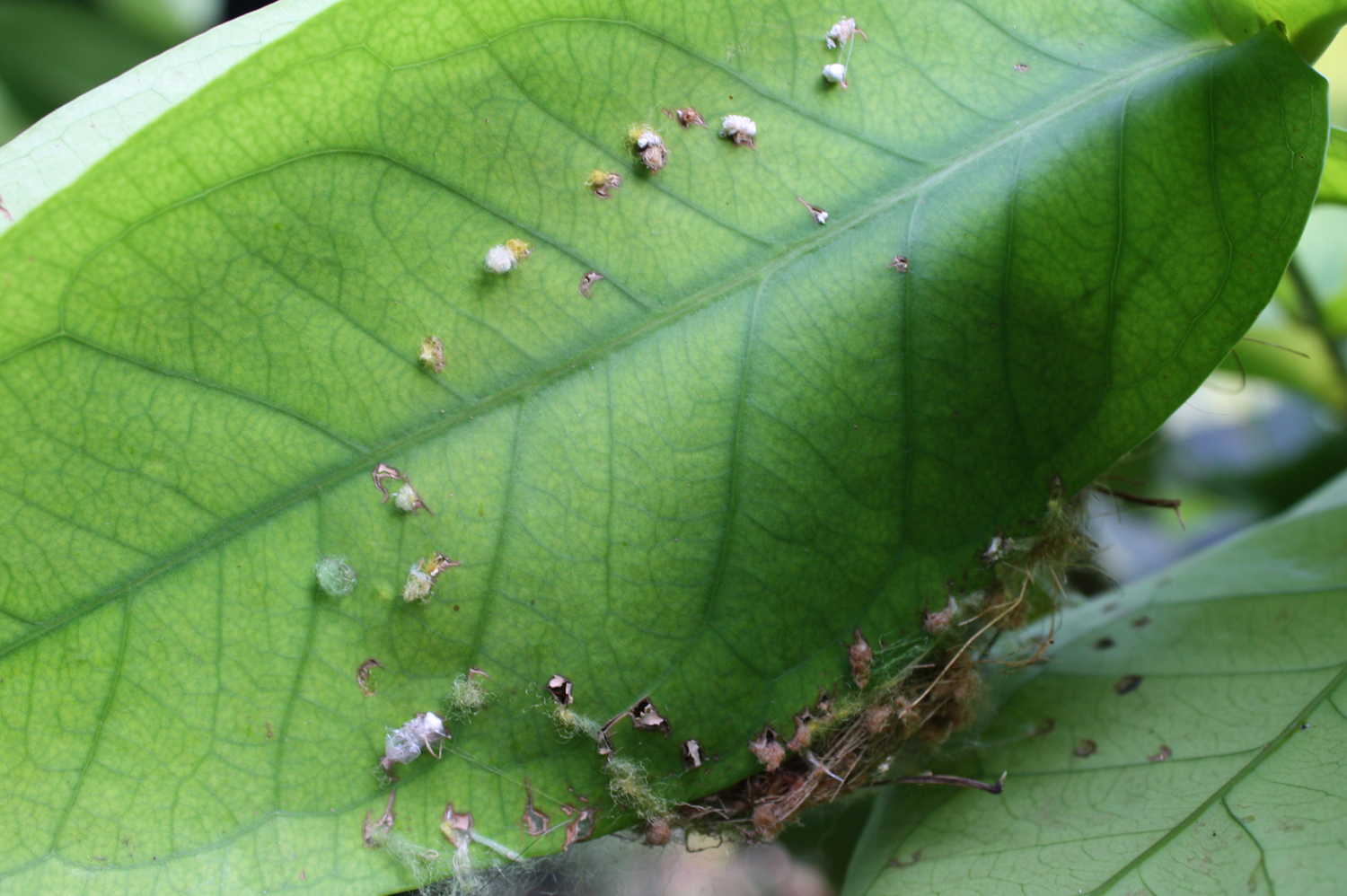
Leaf holding the nest showing "rivets"

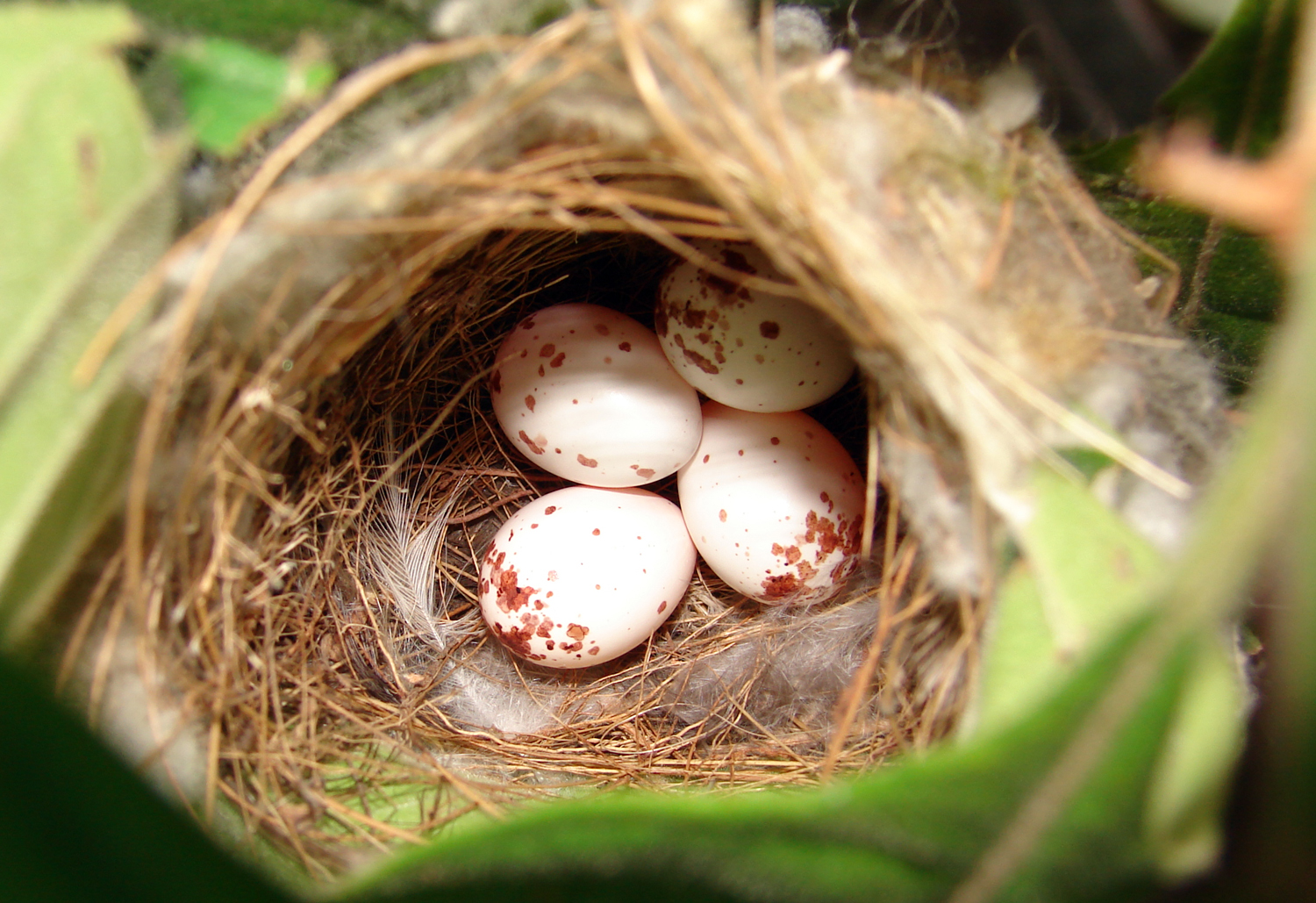
View from above showing eggs

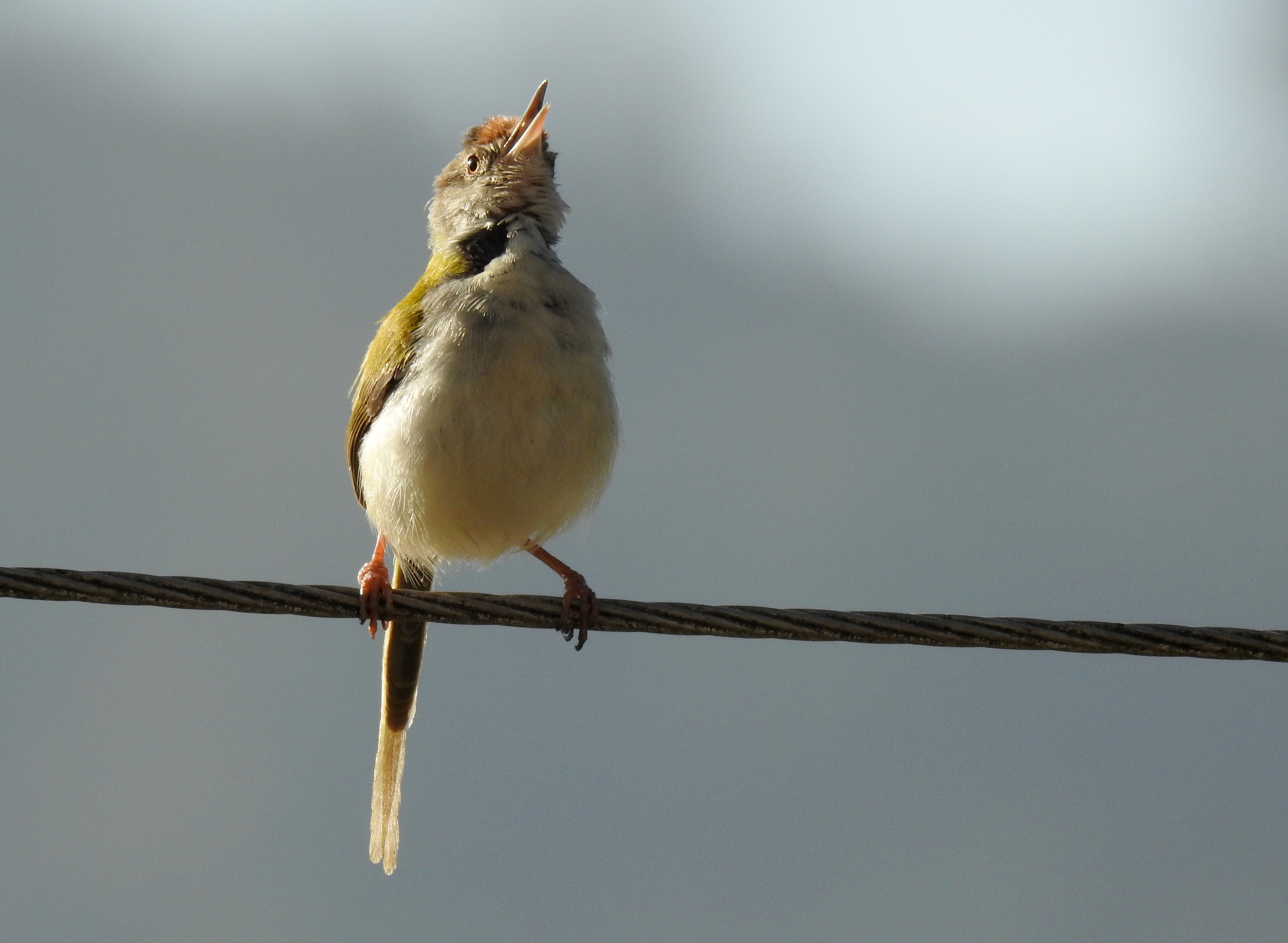
Male with elongated central tail feathers singing showing dark bare skin under neck feathers

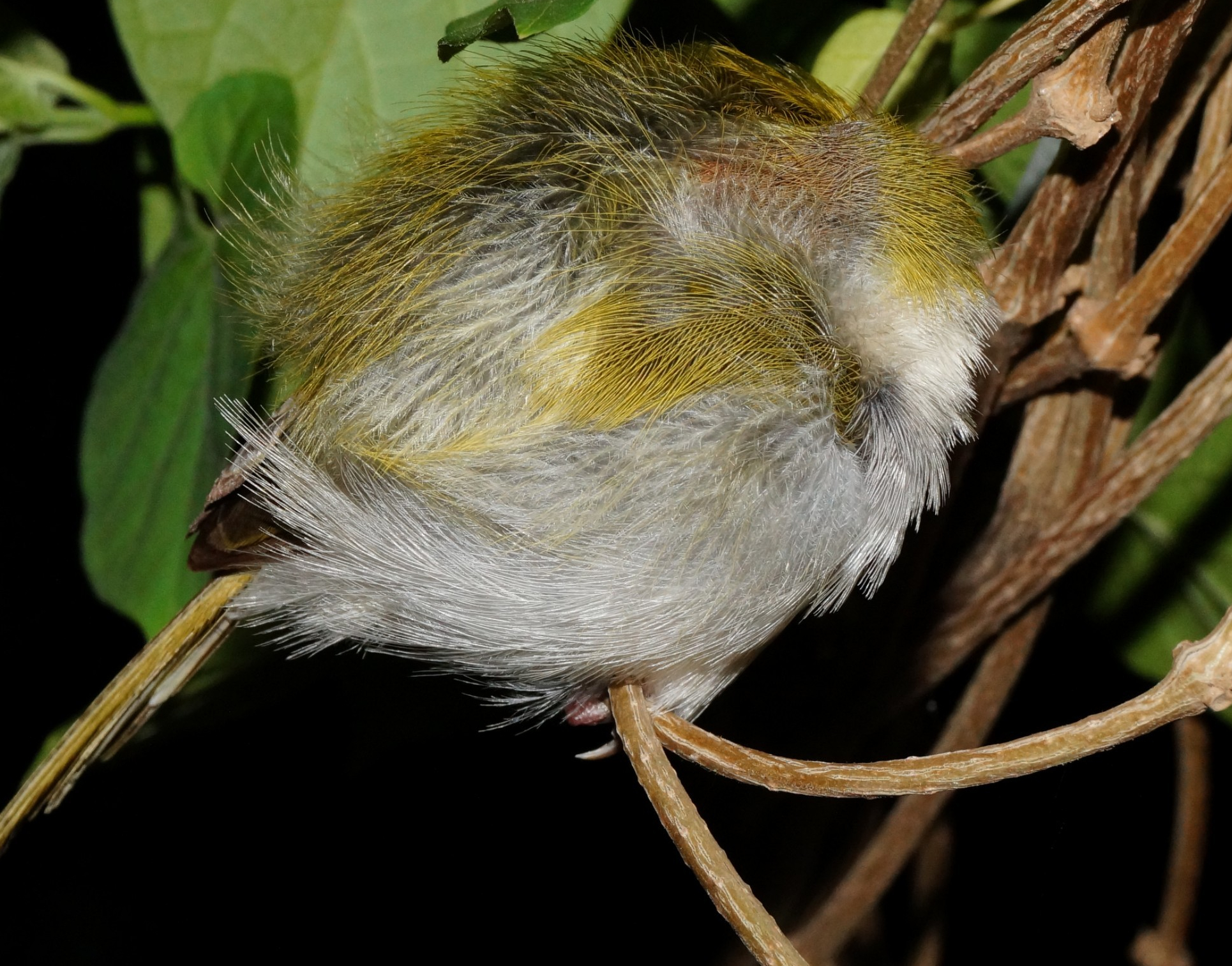
Roosting tailorbird

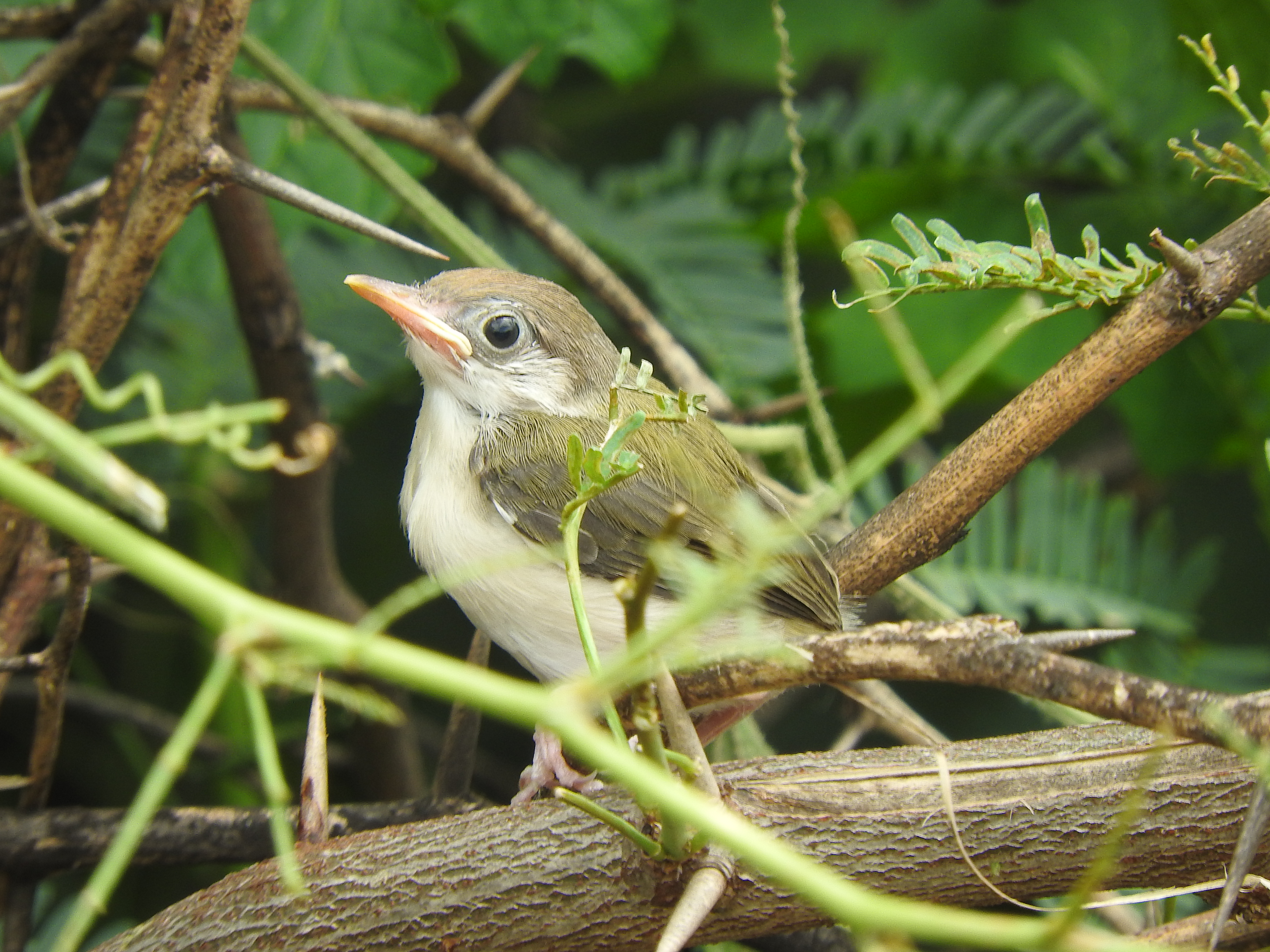
Juvenile in Pallikaranai wetland, Chennai

== Other sources ==
- Sen, S.N. (1947). "An early nest of the Tailor Bird [Orthotomus sutorius (Pennant)]". J. Bombay Nat. Hist. Soc. 47 (1): 159–160.
- Green, E.E. (1899). "Birds tapping at window-panes". J. Bombay Nat. Hist. Soc. 12 (2): 415.
- Fernando, H.F. (1913). "Note on "Orthotomus sutorius" – the Indian Tailor Bird". Spolia Zeylanica. 8 (32): 300–302.
