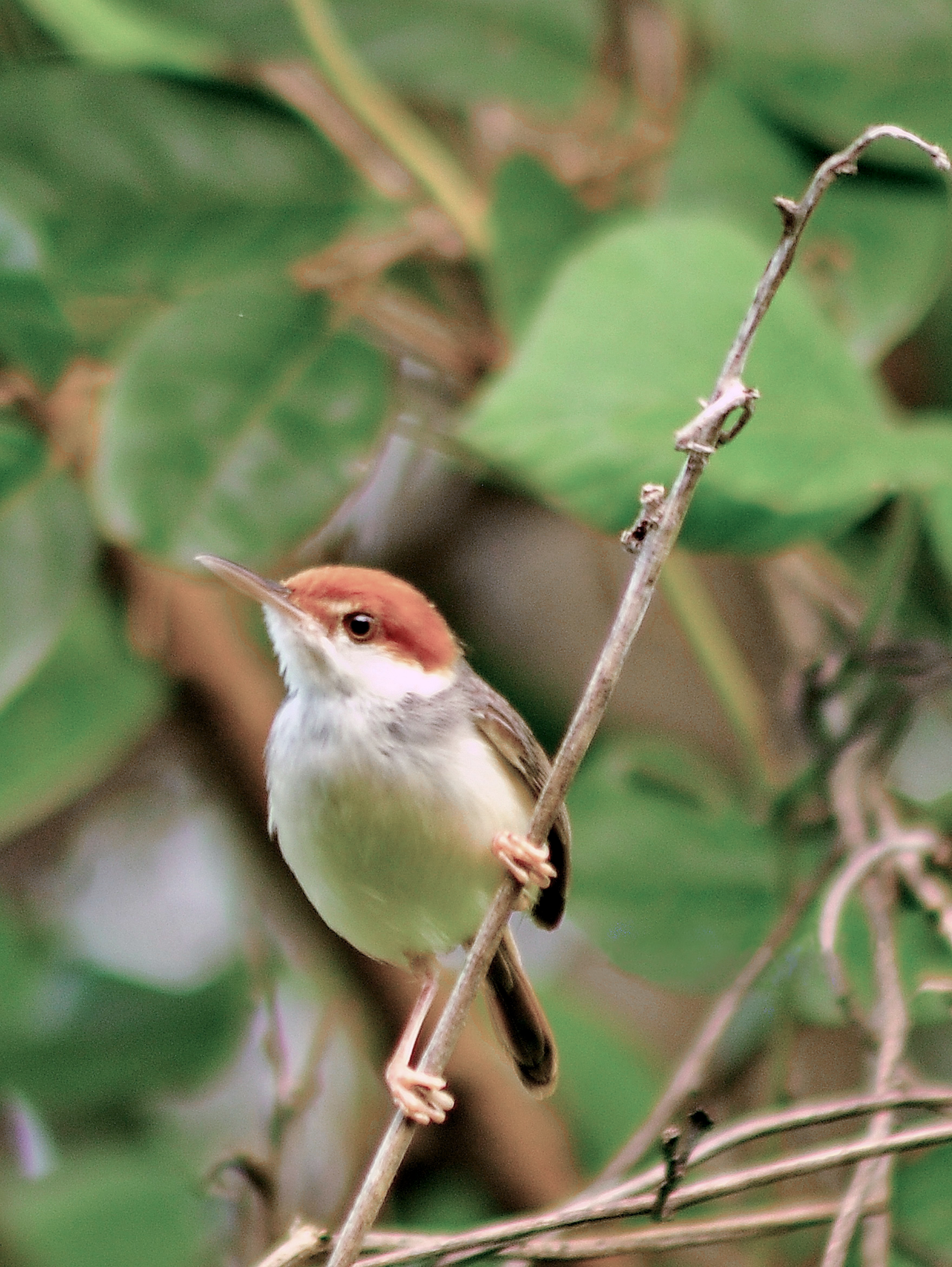

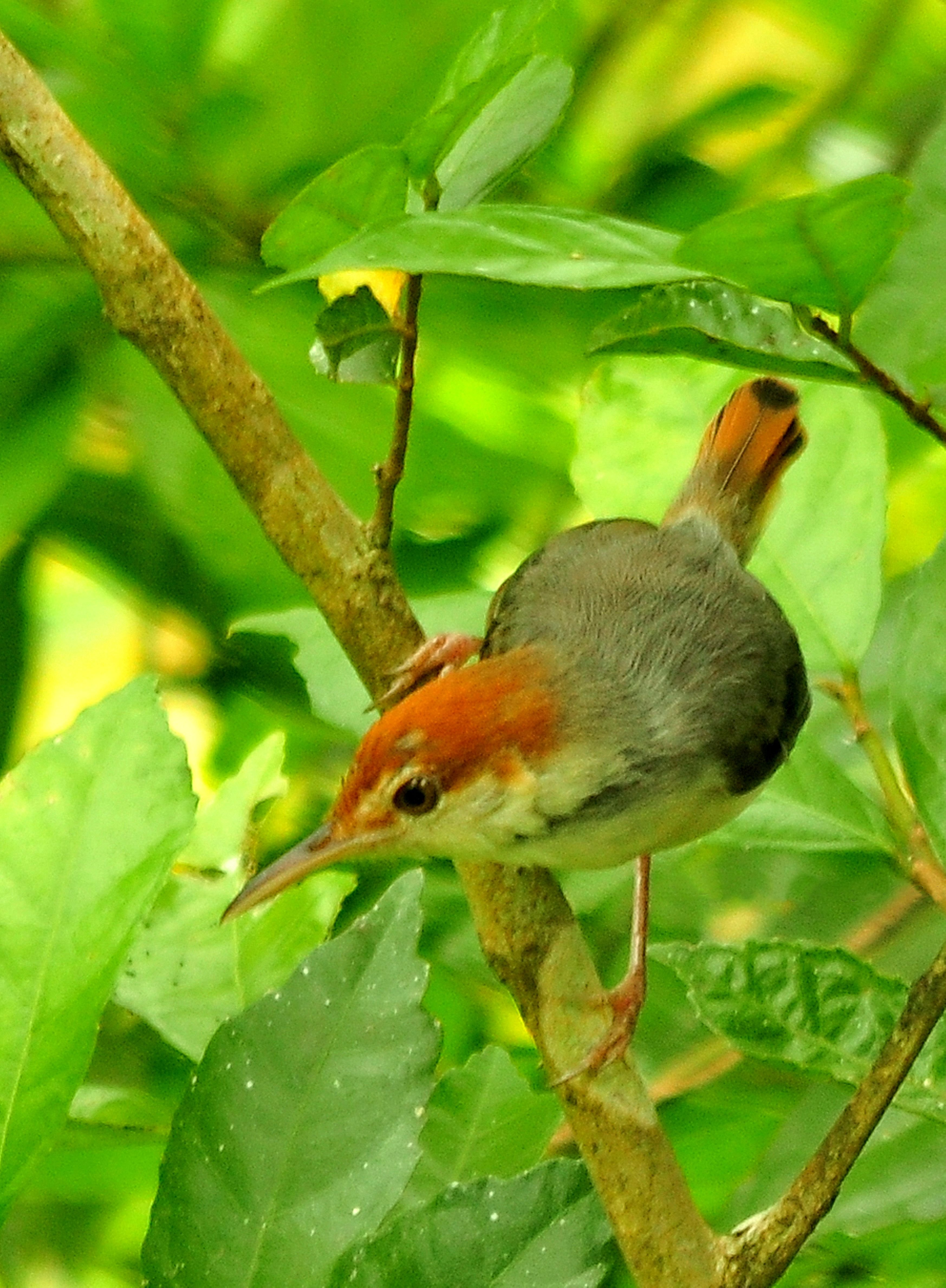

Conservation status
- Least Concern (IUCN 3.1)

Scientific classification
- Kingdom: Animalia
- Phylum: Chordata
- Class: Aves
- Order: Passeriformes
- Family: Cisticolidae
- Genus: Orthotomus
- Species: O. sericeus

Binomial name
- Orthotomus sericeus Temminck, 1836

= Rufous-tailed tailorbird =

Species of bird

The rufous-tailed tailorbird (Orthotomus sericeus) is a species of bird formerly placed in the "Old World warbler" assemblage, it but now placed in the family Cisticolidae. It is found in Brunei, Indonesia, Malaysia, Myanmar, the Philippines, Singapore, and Thailand. Its natural habitats are subtropical or tropical moist lowland forest and subtropical or tropical mangrove forest.
