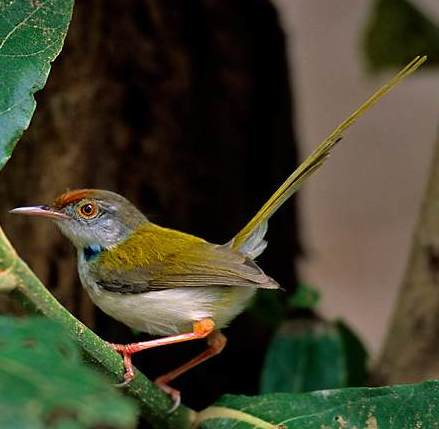
- Common tailorbirds (Orthotomus sutorius)

Scientific classification
- Kingdom: Animalia
- Phylum: Chordata
- Class: Aves
- Order: Passeriformes
- Family: Cisticolidae
- Genus: Orthotomus; Horsfield, 1821

Type species
- Orthotomus sepium Horsfield, 1821

Species
- See text

= Tailorbird =

Genus of birds

Tailorbirds are small birds, most belonging to the genus Orthotomus. While they were often placed in the Old World warbler family Sylviidae, recent research suggests they more likely belong in the Cisticolidae and they are treated as such in Del Hoyo et al. One former species, the mountain tailorbird (and therefore also its sister species rufous-headed tailorbird), is actually closer to an old world warbler genus Cettia.

They occur in the Old World tropics, principally in Asia.

These cisticolas are usually brightly colored, with green or grey upper parts and yellow white or grey under parts. They often have chestnut on the head.

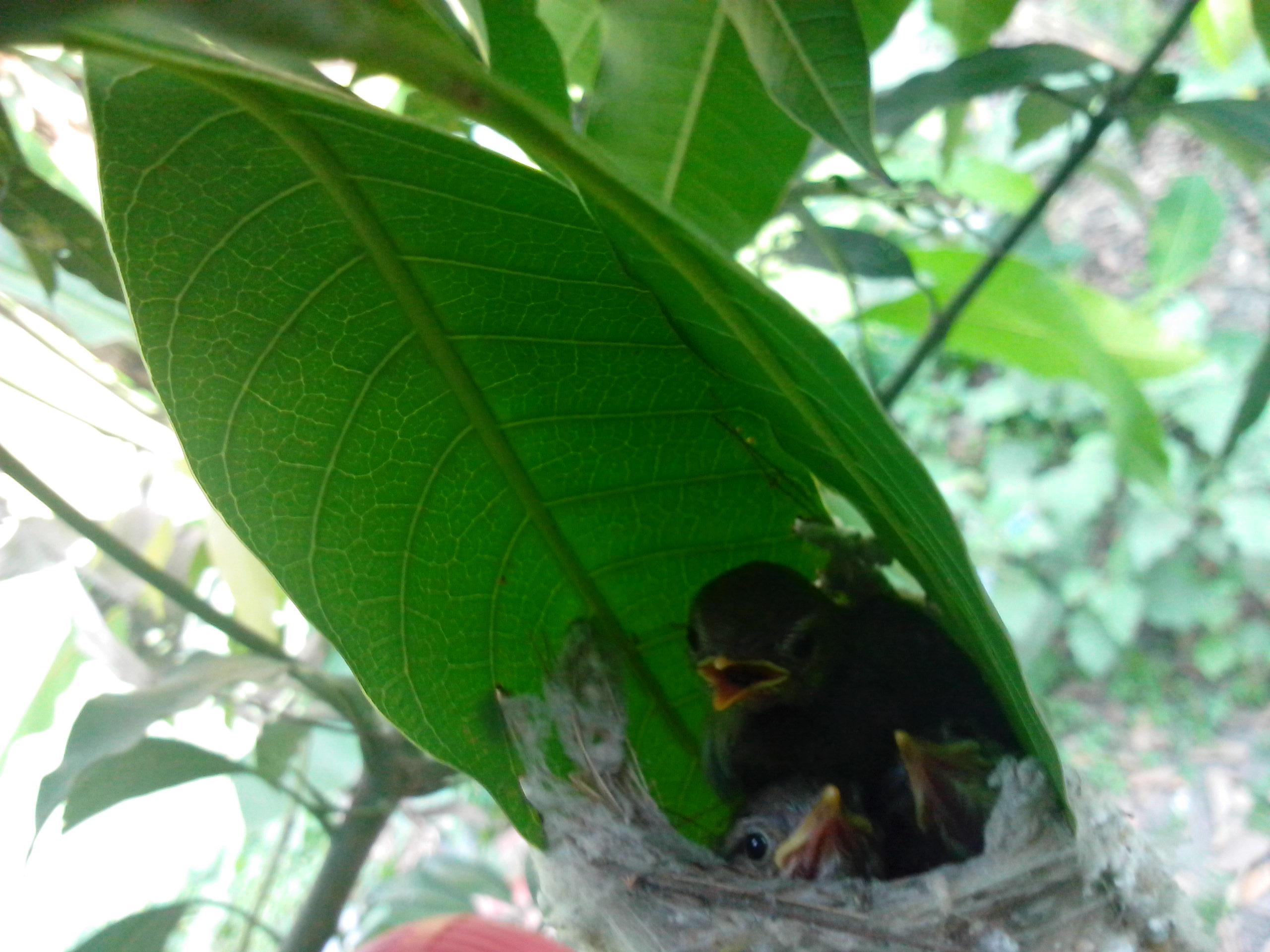
Tailorbird baby and nest

Tailorbirds have short rounded wings, short tails, strong legs and long curved bills. The tail is typically held upright, like a wren. They are typically found in open woodland, scrub and gardens.

Tailorbirds get their name from the way their nest is constructed. The edges of a large leaf are pierced and sewn together with plant fibre or spider's web to make a cradle in which the actual grass nest is built.

== Taxonomy ==
The genus Orthotomus was introduced in 1821 by the American naturalist Thomas Horsfield to include a single species, Orthotomus sepium Horsfield, 1821, the olive-backed tailorbird. This is therefore the type species of the genus by monotypy. The genus name is from Ancient Greek ορθος/orthos meaning "straight" and τομευς/tomeus, τομεως/tomeōs meaning "knife" or "edge".

== Species ==
The genus contains 13 species:

Image	Common name	Scientific name	Distribution
	Common tailorbird	Orthotomus sutorius	China, Sri Lanka, Thailand, Laos, Malaysia, Singapore, Cambodia, and Vietnam
	Dark-necked tailorbird	Orthotomus atrogularis	Bangladesh, Northeast India, and Southeast Asia
	Cambodian tailorbird	Orthotomus chaktomuk	Cambodia
	Visayan tailorbird	Orthotomus castaneiceps	Philippines
	Green-backed tailorbird	Orthotomus chloronotus	Philippines
	Rufous-fronted tailorbird	Orthotomus frontalis	eastern Philippines
	Grey-backed tailorbird	Orthotomus derbianus	Philippines (Palawan, Luzon, and Catanduanes)
	Rufous-tailed tailorbird	Orthotomus sericeus	Brunei, Indonesia, Malaysia, Myanmar, Philippines, Singapore, and Thailand
	Ashy tailorbird	Orthotomus ruficeps	Brunei, Indonesia, Malaysia, Myanmar, Philippines, Singapore, Thailand, and Vietnam
	Olive-backed tailorbird	Orthotomus sepium	Indonesia (Java, Madura Island, Bali and Lombok)
	Yellow-breasted tailorbird	Orthotomus samarensis	Philippines
	Black-headed tailorbird	Orthotomus nigriceps	Philippines (Mindanao, Dinagat, and Siargao)
	White-eared tailorbird	Orthotomus cinereiceps	Philippines (Basilan and West Mindanao)

Two species moved to the Cettiidae:

- Mountain tailorbird, Phyllergates cucullatus
- Rufous-headed tailorbird, Phyllergates heterolaemus
