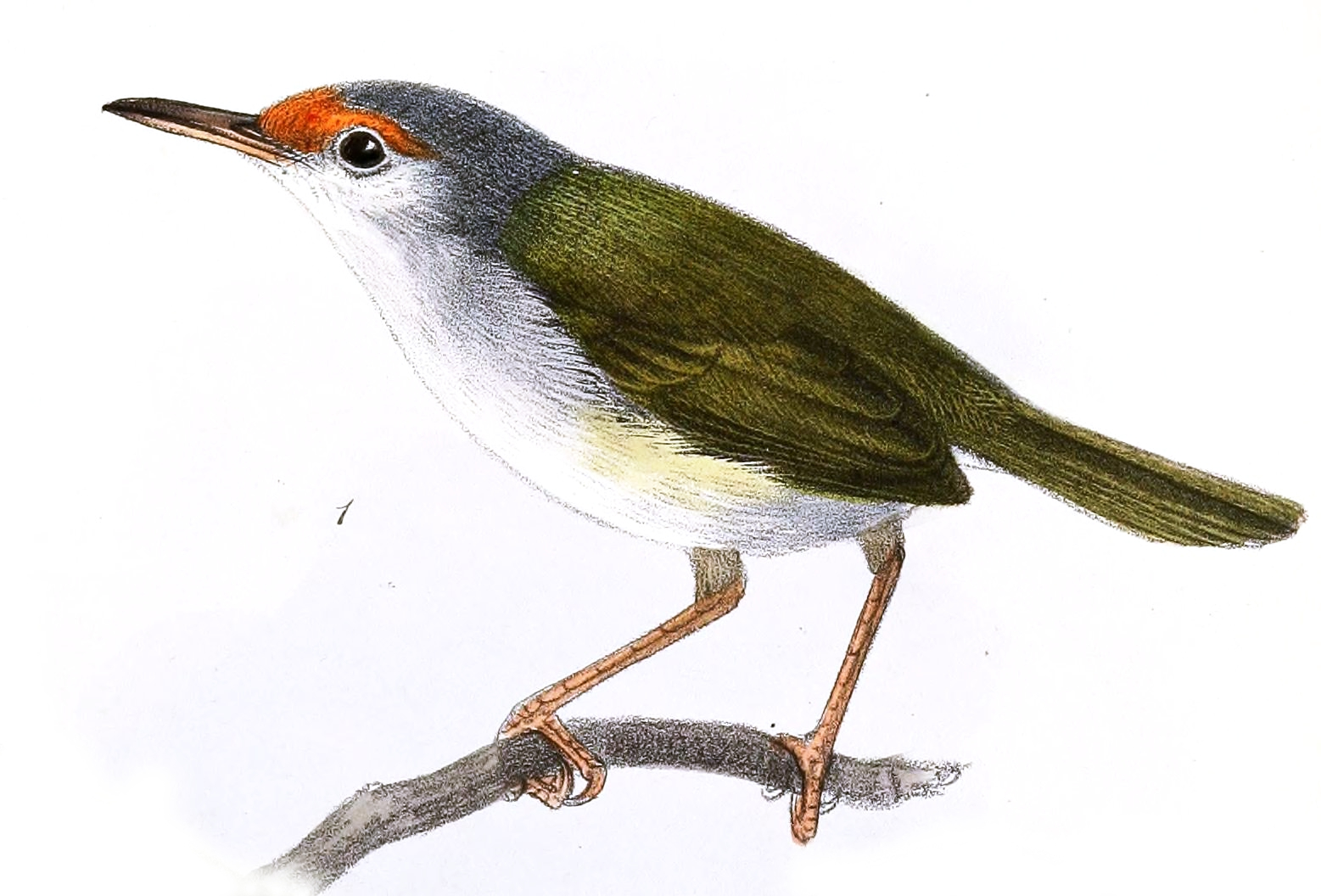

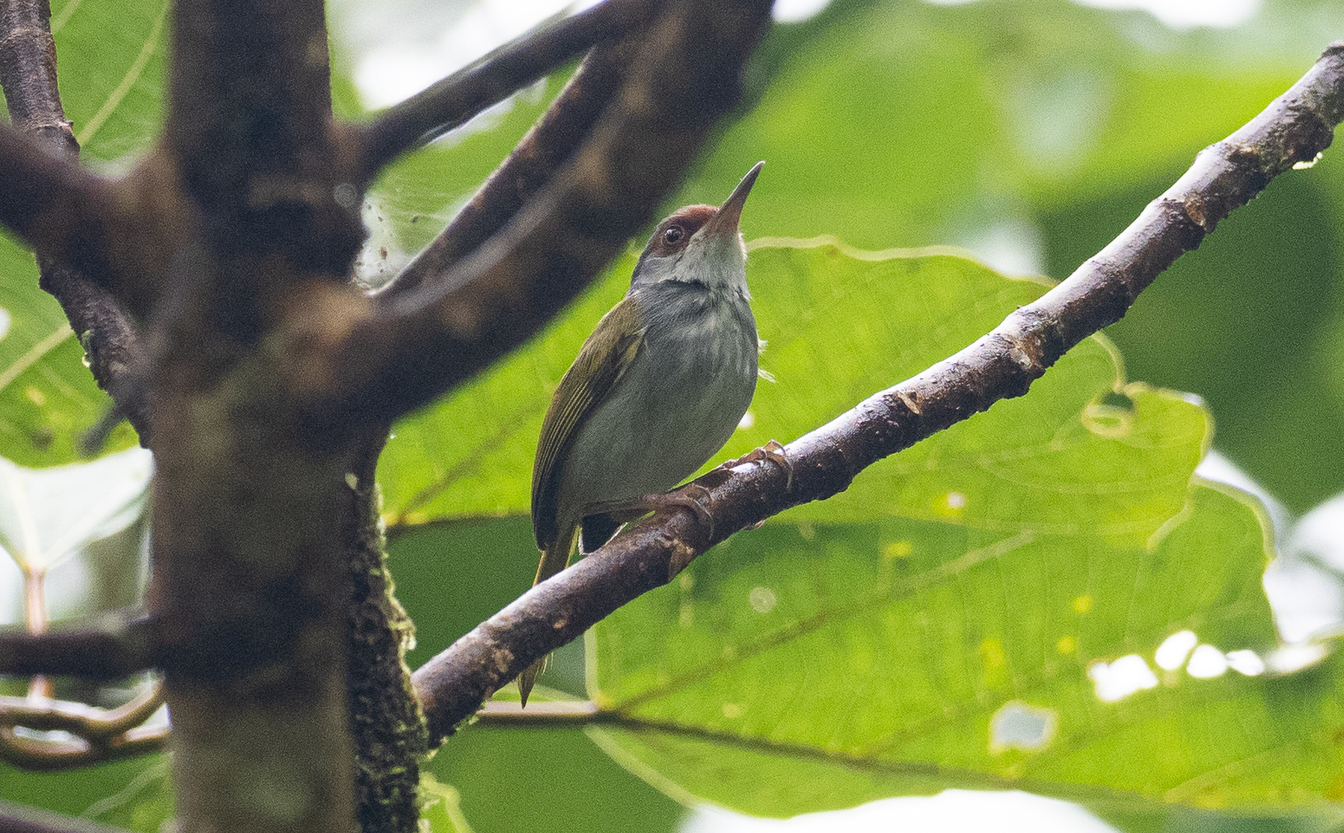

Conservation status
- Least Concern (IUCN 3.1)

Scientific classification
- Kingdom: Animalia
- Phylum: Chordata
- Class: Aves
- Order: Passeriformes
- Family: Cisticolidae
- Genus: Orthotomus
- Species: O. frontalis

Binomial name
- Orthotomus frontalis Sharpe, 1877

= Rufous-fronted tailorbird =

Species of bird

The rufous-fronted tailorbird (Orthotomus frontalis) is a species of bird formerly placed in the Old World warbler assemblage, but now placed in the family Cisticolidae. It is native to the southern and eastern Philippines. Its natural habitats are tropical moist lowland forests and tropical mangrove forests.

== Description and taxonomy ==
=== Subspecies ===
Two subspecies are recognized:

- O. f. frontalis Sharpe, RB, 1877 – Found on Mindanao
- O. f. mearsi McGregor, RC, 1907 – Found on Basilan; similar to the nominate but with more extensive chestnut that extends to the crown

== Ecology and behavior ==
It is often seen in pairs in the dense undergrowth where it feeds on small invertebrates. Not much is known about their breeding habits. A nest has been observed in Basilan in March. Lays 2 to 3 eggs.

== Habitat and conservation status ==
Its natural habitat is tropical moist lowland forests and second growth.

IUCN has assessed this bird as least-concern species and the population is believed to be stable as it is still locally common and can tolerate second growth.

Occurs in a few protected areas like Pasonanca Natural Park, Mount Apo and Mount Kitanglad on Mindanao, Rajah Sikatuna Protected Landscape in Bohol and Samar Island Natural Park but actual protection and enforcement from illegal logging and hunting are lax.
