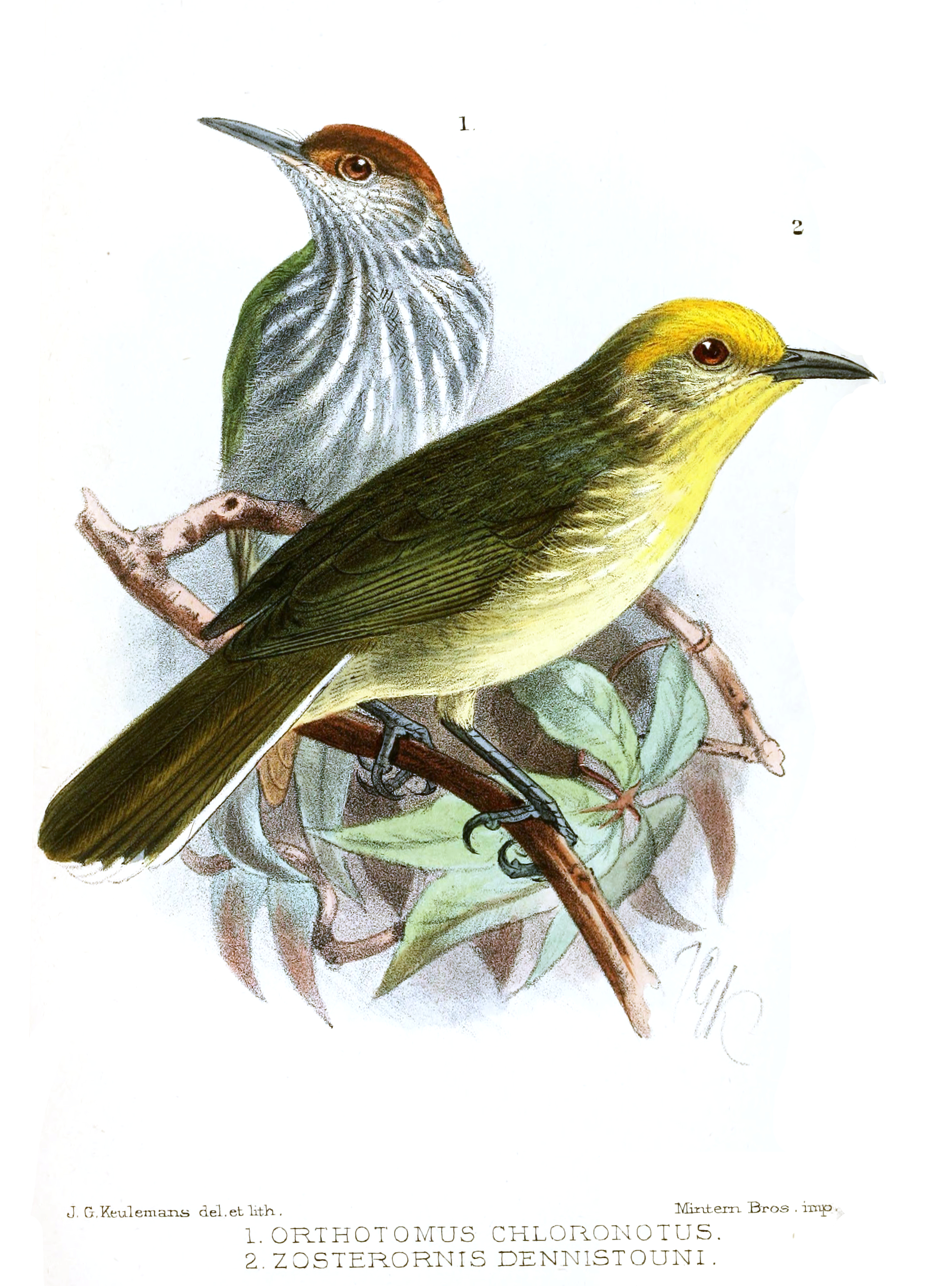
- Trilling tailorbird (left)
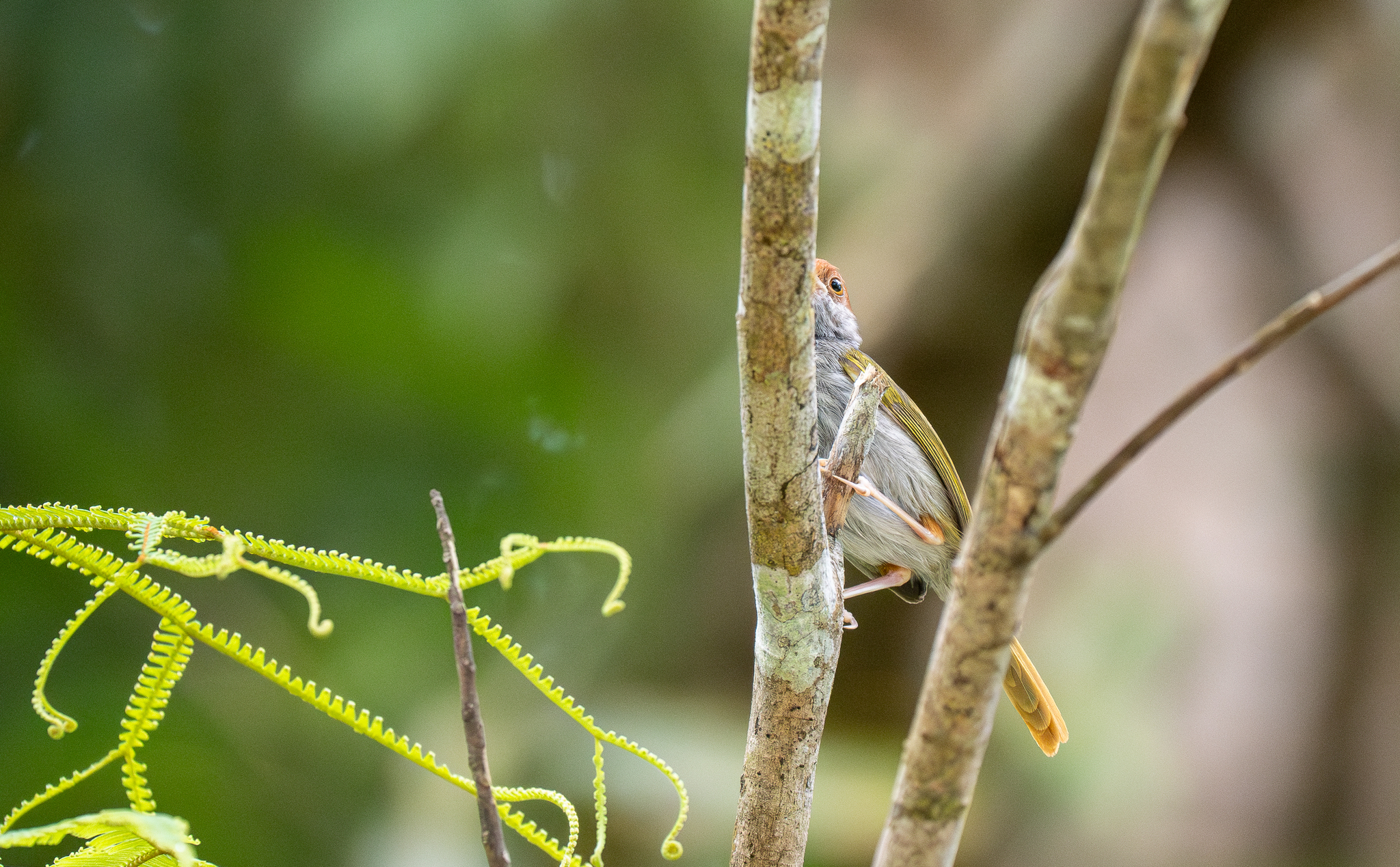

Conservation status
- Least Concern (IUCN 3.1)

Scientific classification
- Kingdom: Animalia
- Phylum: Chordata
- Class: Aves
- Order: Passeriformes
- Family: Cisticolidae
- Genus: Orthotomus
- Species: O. chloronotus

Binomial name
- Orthotomus chloronotus Ogilvie-Grant, 1895

= Green-backed tailorbird =

Species of bird

The green-backed tailorbird (Orthotomus chloronotus), also known as the trilling tailorbird, is a species of bird formerly placed in the "Old World warbler" assemblage, but now placed in the family Cisticolidae. The bird is endemic to the Philippines on the Northern side of the island of Luzon. Its natural habitats are tropical moist lowland forests, tropical mangrove forests and secondary growth.

== Description ==
It was formerly conspecific with Philippine tailorbird but differentatied by its green back, darker underparts and stronger trilling call. This species is monotypic.

== Ecology and behavior ==
It is known to feed on small invertebrates. Usually seen foraging in dense undergrowth, typically in pairs.

Breeding season believed to be at least in March to May. Nest is typically placed 2 to 10 meters above the ground on the tip of a branch or leaf of a fern. Like all tailorbirds, nest is complex and sown together to form a pouch. Lays 2 to 3 eggs which are white with reddish and brown spots.

== Habitat and conservation status ==
It lives in lowland forest edge and clearings and also agricultural land and any secondary growth with tangled undergrowths up to 1,060 meters above sea level.

IUCN Red List has assessed this as least-concern as it is tolerant, if not more suited to degraded habitat.
