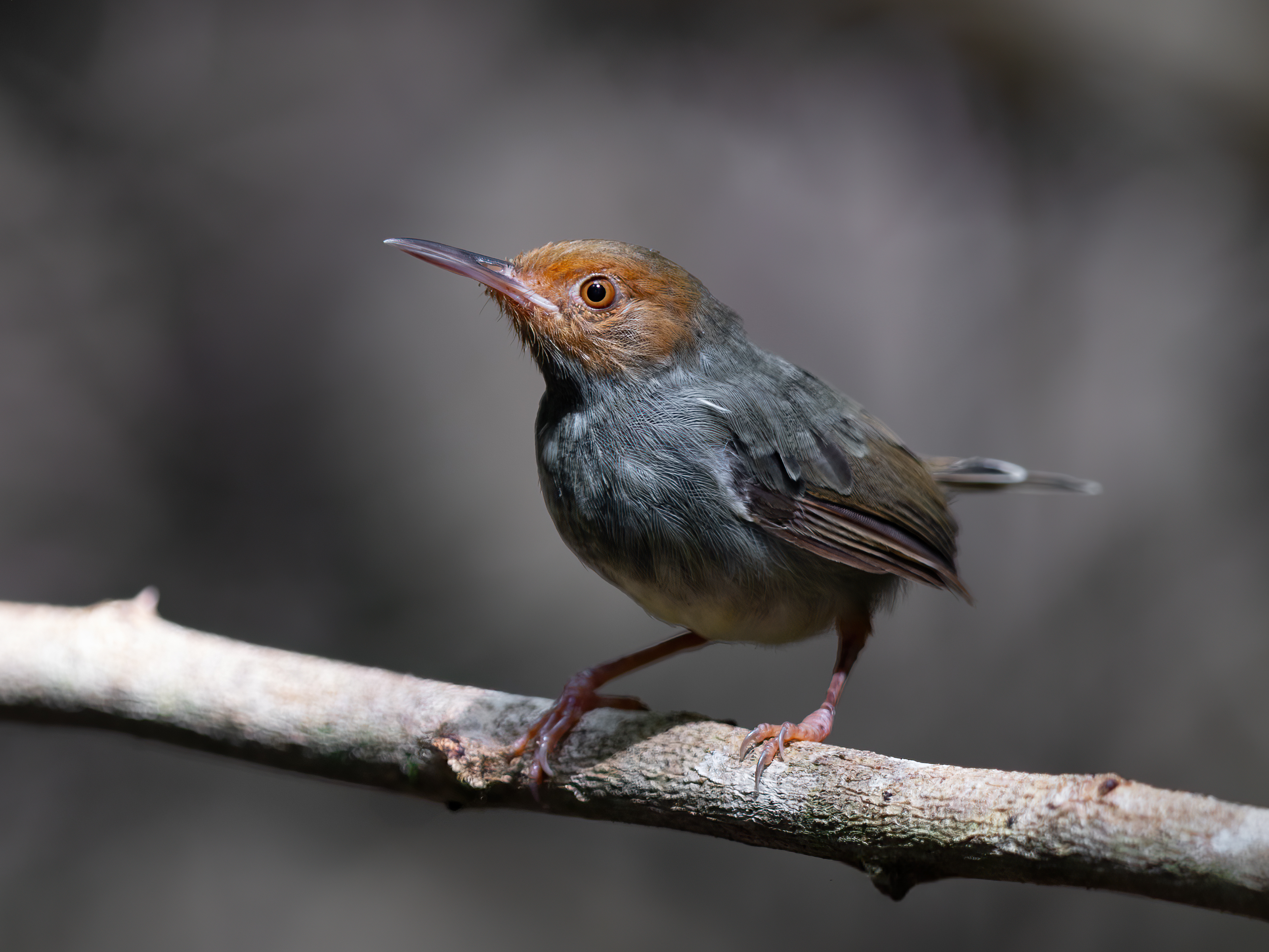

Conservation status
- Least Concern (IUCN 3.1)

Scientific classification
- Kingdom: Animalia
- Phylum: Chordata
- Class: Aves
- Order: Passeriformes
- Family: Cisticolidae
- Genus: Orthotomus
- Species: O. sepium

Binomial name
- Orthotomus sepium Horsfield, 1821

= Olive-backed tailorbird =

Species of bird

The olive-backed tailorbird (Orthotomus sepium) is a species of passerine bird formerly placed in the "Old World warbler" assemblage, it but now placed in the family Cisticolidae.

It is endemic to the islands of Java, Madura Island, Bali and Lombok. It resides in open forests, often perching on short trees and shrubs.

== Description ==
It is small, with a rust-colored head.

== Diet ==
It is insectivorous. It forages for caterpillars, spiders, and small insects.

== Social Behavior ==
It is often seen in groups, and is known to engage in group vocalizations.
