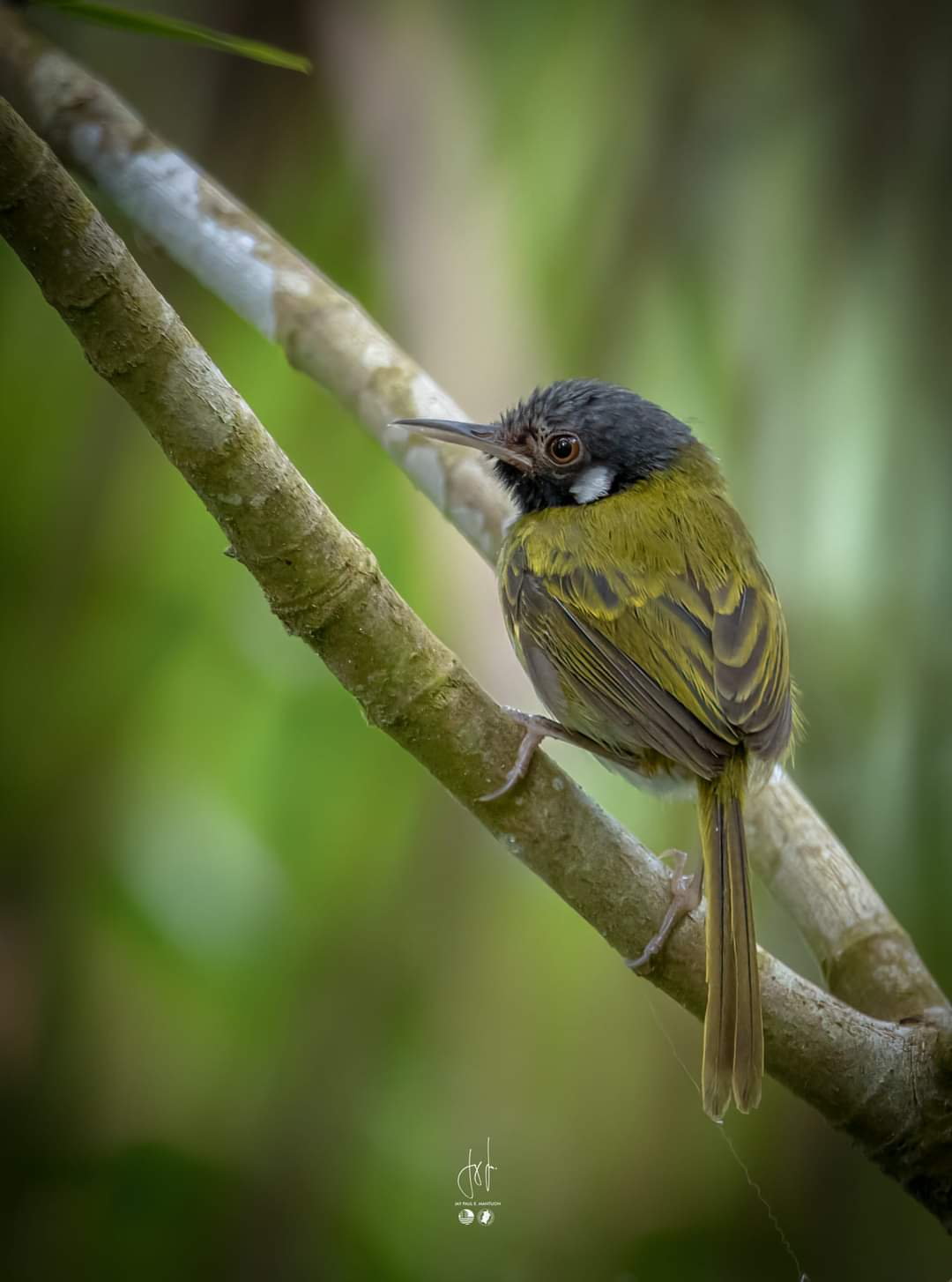
- ssp. obscurior

Conservation status
- Least Concern (IUCN 3.1)

Scientific classification
- Kingdom: Animalia
- Phylum: Chordata
- Class: Aves
- Order: Passeriformes
- Family: Cisticolidae
- Genus: Orthotomus
- Species: O. cinereiceps

Binomial name
- Orthotomus cinereiceps Sharpe, 1877

= White-eared tailorbird =

Species of bird

The white-eared tailorbird (Orthotomus cinereiceps) is a species of bird formerly placed in the "Old World warbler" assemblage, it but now placed in the family Cisticolidae.It is found in the Philippine islands of Basilan and West Mindanao.

== Description and taxonomy ==
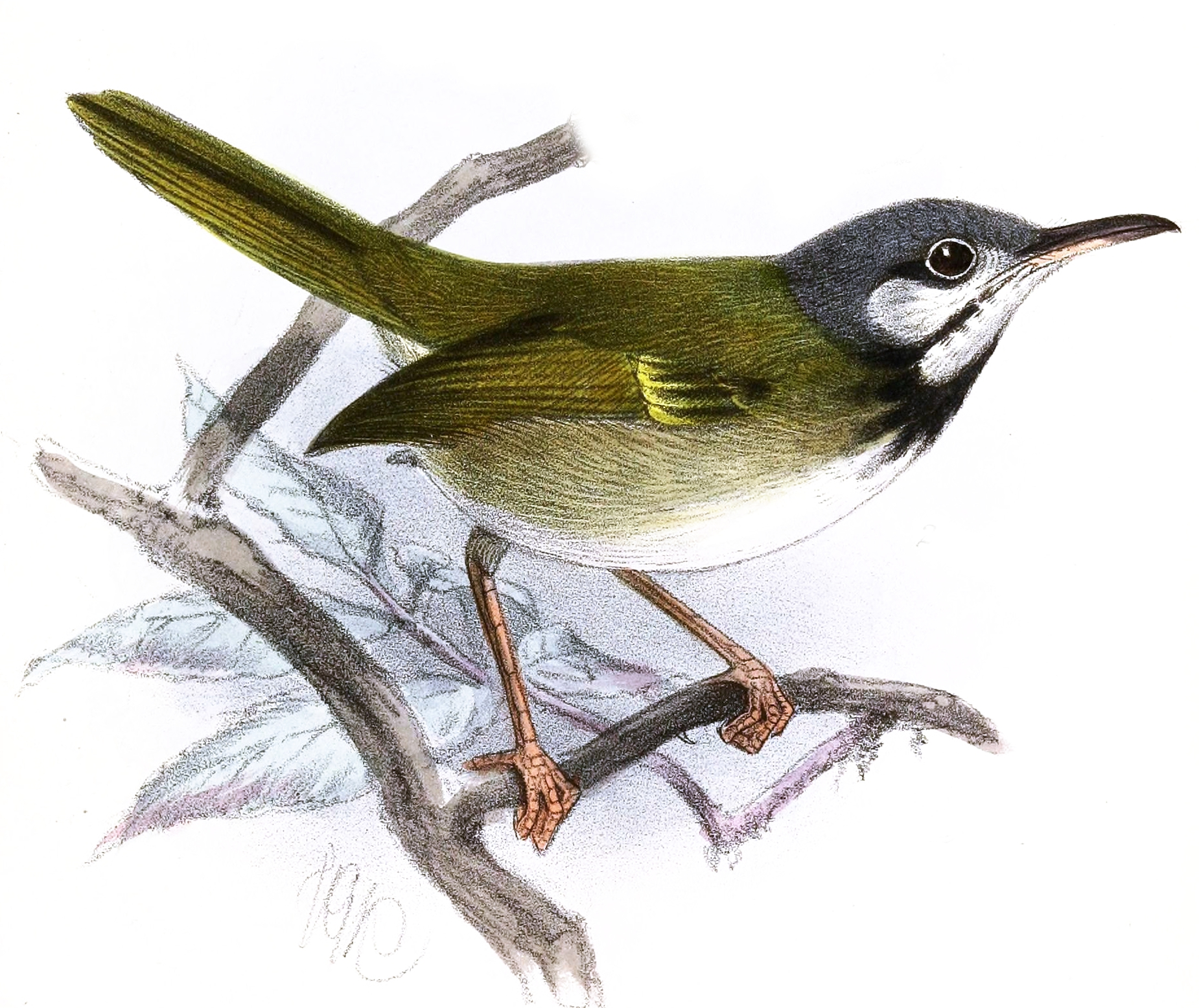
An illustration by John Gerrard Keulemans

This species is small long-billed and long-tailed bird found in the undergrowth of West Mindanao. This species has primarily olive green plummage with a pale gray belly, a black head and an eponymous white spot on its ear.

This species exhibits sexual dimorphism in which the female has a white throat patch.

The White-eared tailorbird is one of 13 species in the tailorbird genus Orthotomus. It has historically sometimes been considered to be the same species as the yellow-breasted and white-eared tailorbirds due to similarities in their vocalisations which include a monotunous piping notes and a rapid nasal sounding trill.; however, these three species are genetically distinct, although they form a superspecies. According to a 2012 study of genetic data, the black-headed tailorbird is sister (most closely related) to the white-eared tailorbird, and these two species are further sister to the yellow-breasted tailorbird.

=== Subspecies ===
Two subspecies are recognized:

- Orthotomus cinereiceps cinereiceps: Found on Basilan Island
- Orthotomus cinereiceps obscurior: Found in Zamboanga Peninsula. Cotabato. Misamis Oriental,

== Ecology and behavior ==
It is known to feed on small invertebrates. Usually seen foraging in dense undergrowth, typically in pairs. There is no breeding information on this bird aside from a reported nest in August in Basilan and birds with enlarged gonads have been collected on April and May.

== Habitat and conservation status ==
White-eared tailorbird is found in dense tangles in primary and secondary forest and forest clearings up to 1,000 meters above sea level.

IUCN has assessed this bird as a Least-concern species due to its tolerance to degraded habitat.
