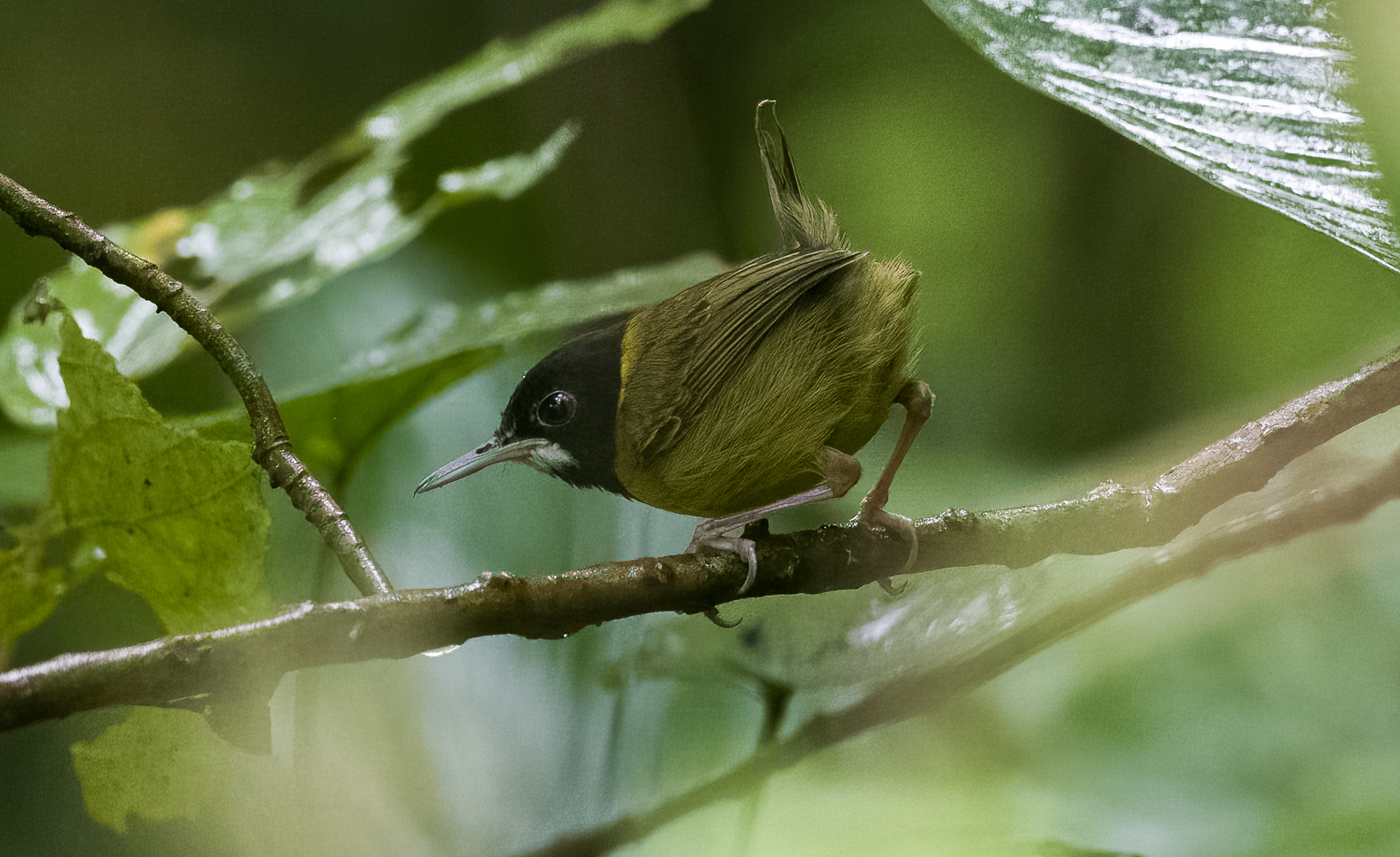
- Male

Conservation status
- Least Concern (IUCN 3.1)

Scientific classification
- Kingdom: Animalia
- Phylum: Chordata
- Class: Aves
- Order: Passeriformes
- Family: Cisticolidae
- Genus: Orthotomus
- Species: O. samarensis

Binomial name
- Orthotomus samarensis Steere, 1890

= Yellow-breasted tailorbird =

Species of bird

The yellow-breasted tailorbird (Orthotomus samarensis) is a species of passerine bird formerly placed in the "Old World warbler" assemblage, but now placed in the family Cisticolidae. This species is endemic to Philippines on the islands of Bohol, Samar and Leyte. It is known for its bright color relative to other tailorbirds with a yellow body and a striking black head with a white spot under its chin. Its natural habitat is tropical moist lowland forests. It is threatened by habitat loss.

== Description and taxonomy ==
This species is small long-billed and long-tailed bird found in the undergrowth of Eastern Visayas on the islands of Bohol, Samar, Biliran and Leyte. This species is primarily olive green with yellow underparts, a black head with a white chin.

This species exhibits sexual dimorphism in which the female has a white throat that shows more white streaking.

The Yellow-breasted tailorbird is one of 13 species in the tailorbird genus Orthotomus. It has historically sometimes been considered to be the same species as the yellow-breasted and white-eared tailorbirds due to similarities in their vocalisations which include a monotunous piping notes and a rapid nasal sounding trill.; however, these three species are genetically distinct, although they form a superspecies. According to a 2012 study of genetic data, the Yellow-breasted tailorbird is the furthest apart from the Black-headed and White-eared tailorbird both of which are most closely related.

This species is monotypic and has no separate subspecies.

== Ecology and behavior ==
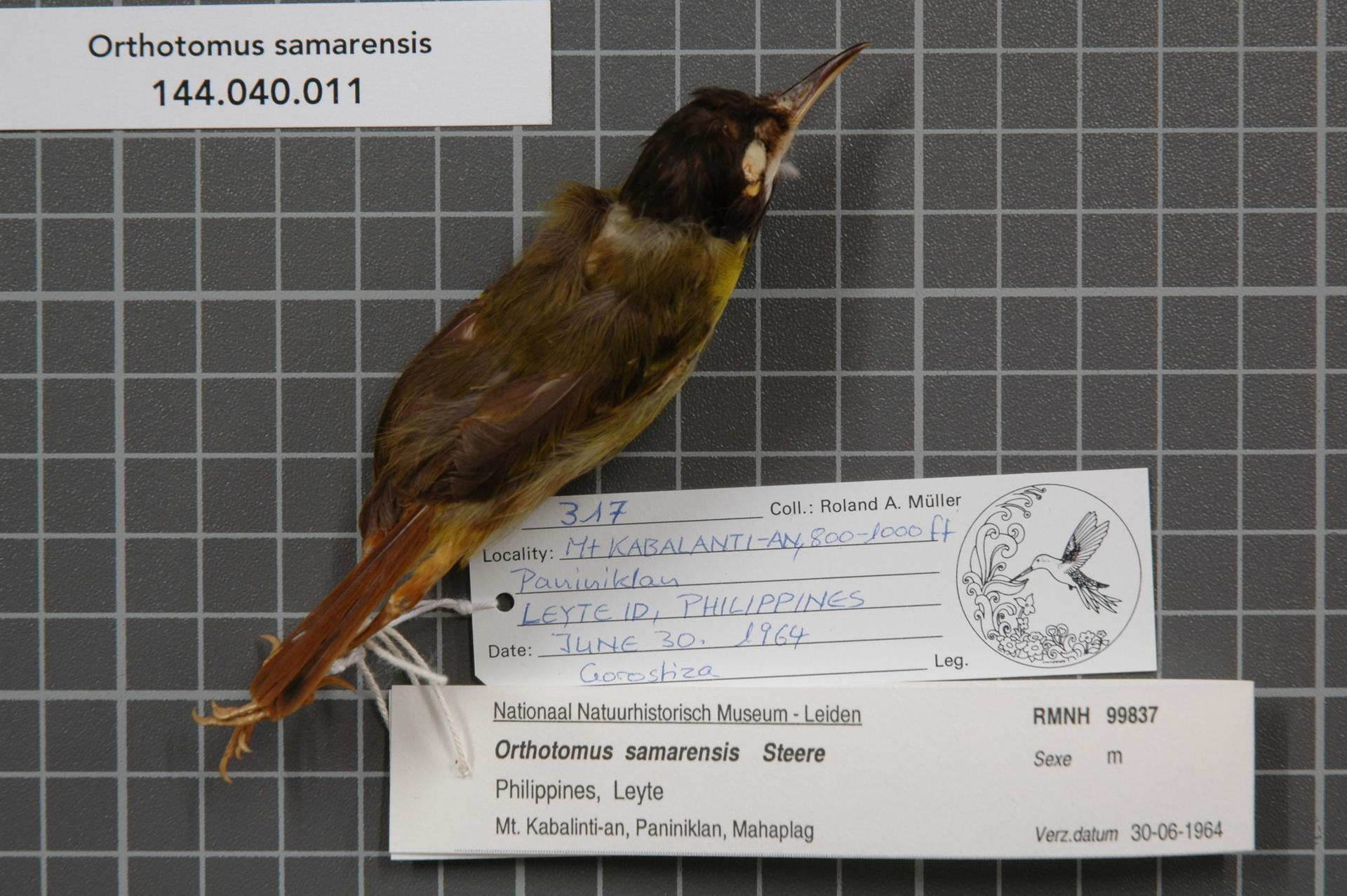
A specimen from the Naturalis Biodiversity Center

It is often seein in pairs in the dense undergrowth where it feeds on small invertebrates. Not much is known about their breeding habits but is believed to occur primarily in the months of July to August, which is the breeding season for a large majority of Philippine forest birds.

== Habitat and conservation status ==
Its natural habitats are tropical moist lowland forest, tropical mangrove forest, and tropical moist shrubland with most records under 1,000 meters above sea level. It is often found foraging in the understorey and lower parts of the canopy.

IUCN formerly assessed this bird as Near-threatened but was reassseed n 2024 as a Least-concern species as this species was generally more common than originally believed. Despite this the population is still said to be decreasing. Extensive lowland deforestation on all islands in its range is the main threat. Most remaining lowland forest that is not afforded protection leaving it vulnerable to both legal and Illegal logging, conversion into farmlands through Slash-and-burn and mining. There is only 4% forest remaining in Bohol and around 400km^{2} of primary forest combined in Samar and Leyte with no respite in deforestation.

This occurs in a few protected areas such as Rajah Sikatuna Protected Landscape and Samar Island Natural Park however protection is lax.

Conservation actions proposed include to survey remaining habitat to better understand ecology and population size. Propose sites supporting key populations for protection and ensure that proposed protected areas receive actual protection from threats.
