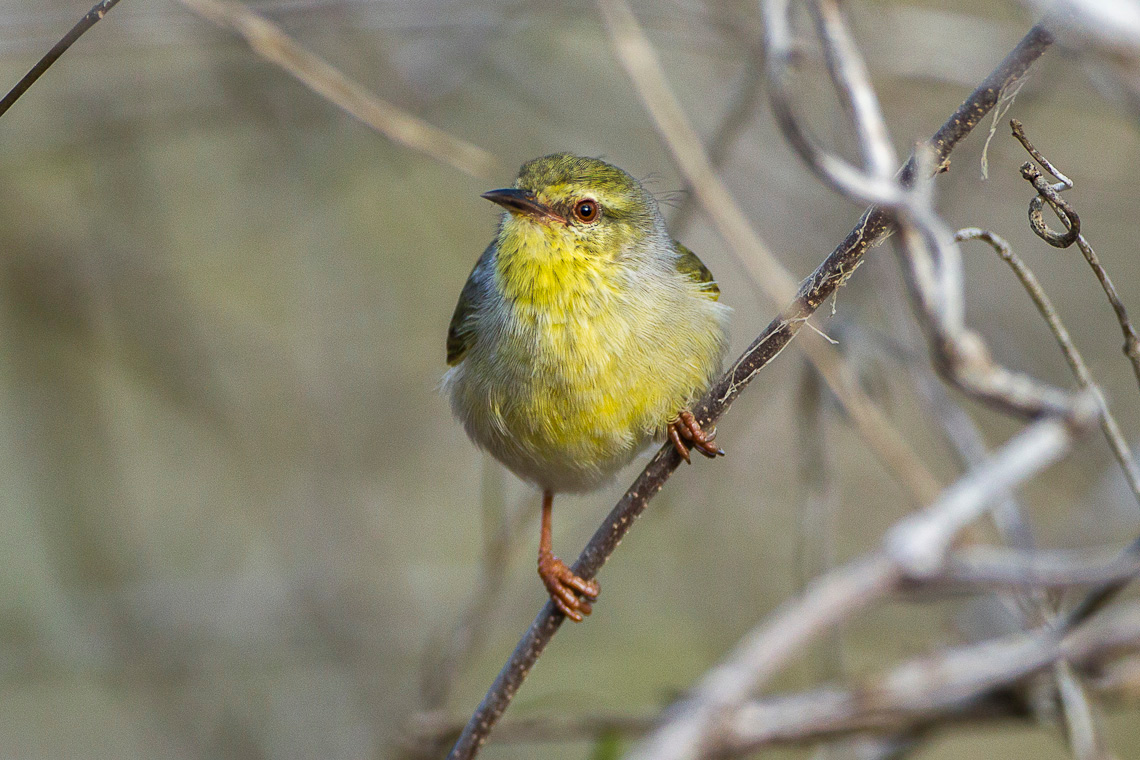

Conservation status
- Least Concern (IUCN 3.1)

Scientific classification
- Kingdom: Animalia
- Phylum: Chordata
- Class: Aves
- Order: Passeriformes
- Family: Cisticolidae
- Genus: Neomixis
- Species: N. striatigula

Binomial name
- Neomixis striatigula Sharpe, 1881
- Native range of Neomixis striatigula

= Stripe-throated jery =

Species of bird

The stripe-throated jery (Neomixis striatigula) is a species of bird in the family Cisticolidae. It is endemic to Madagascar.

Its natural habitats are subtropical or tropical dry forest and subtropical or tropical moist lowland forest.
