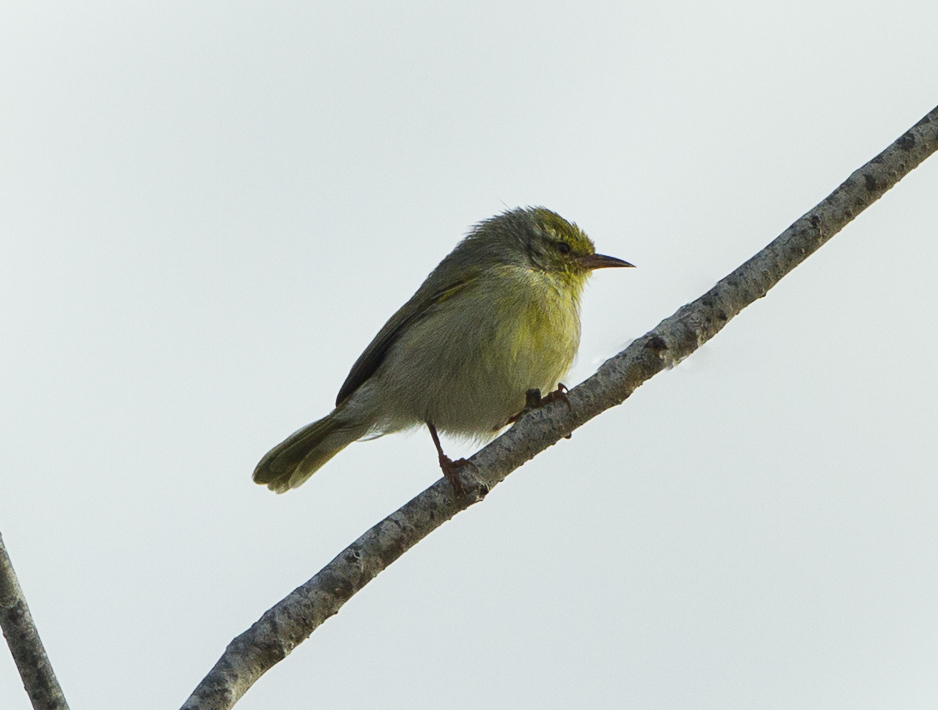

Conservation status
- Least Concern (IUCN 3.1)

Scientific classification
- Kingdom: Animalia
- Phylum: Chordata
- Class: Aves
- Order: Passeriformes
- Family: Cisticolidae
- Genus: Neomixis
- Species: N. tenella

Binomial name
- Neomixis tenella (Hartlaub, 1866)

= Common jery =

Species of bird

The common jery (Neomixis tenella) is a species of bird in the family Cisticolidae. It is endemic to Madagascar.

Its natural habitats are subtropical or tropical dry forest and subtropical or tropical moist lowland forest.

It was first described in 1866 by Gustav Hartlaub.
