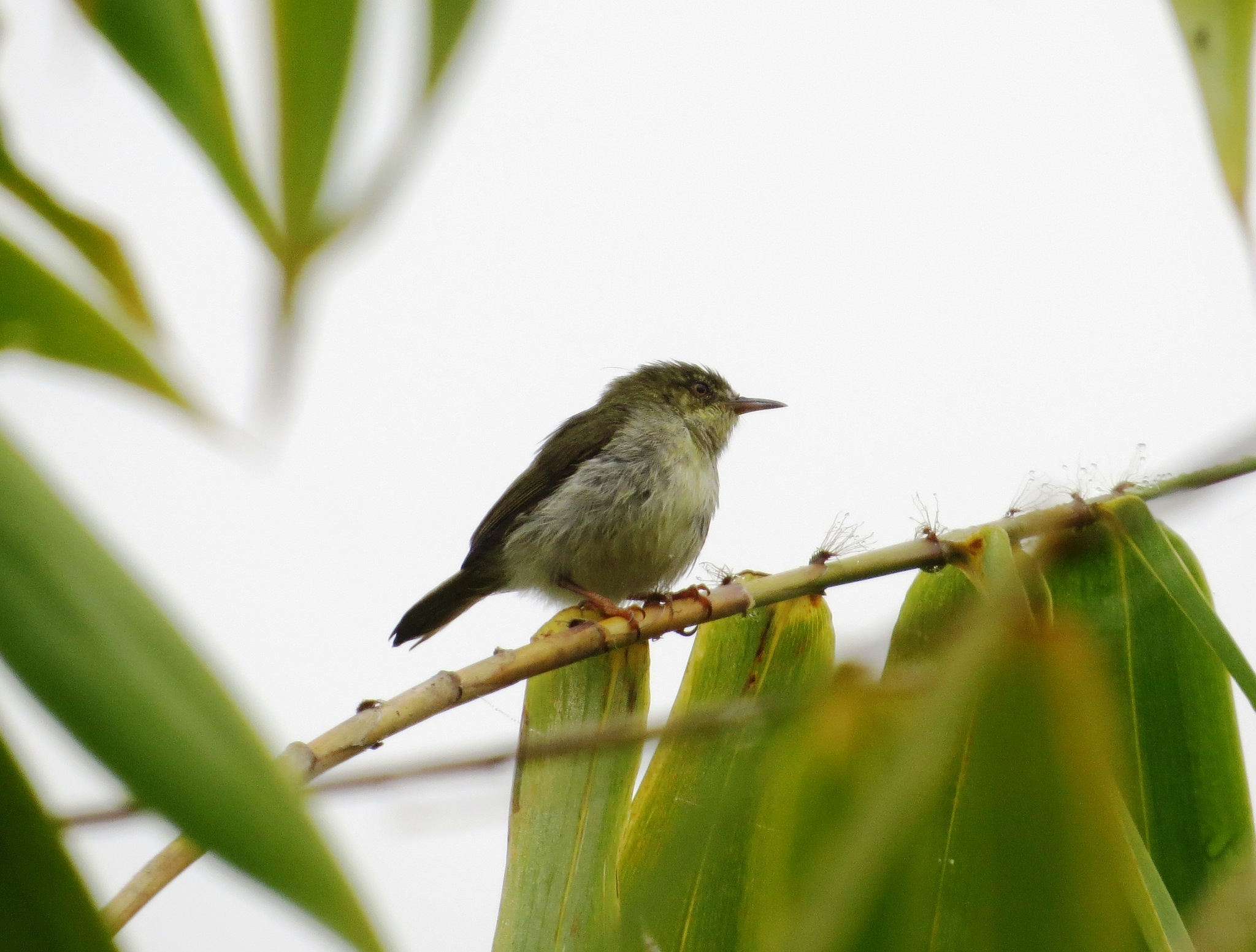

Conservation status
- Least Concern (IUCN 3.1)

Scientific classification
- Kingdom: Animalia
- Phylum: Chordata
- Class: Aves
- Order: Passeriformes
- Family: Cisticolidae
- Genus: Neomixis
- Species: N. viridis

Binomial name
- Neomixis viridis (Sharpe, 1883)

= Green jery =

Species of bird

The green jery (Neomixis viridis) is a species of bird in the family Cisticolidae. It is endemic to Madagascar.

Its natural habitat is subtropical or tropical moist lowland forest.
