= Huambo cisticola =

Conservation status
- Least Concern (IUCN 3.1)

Scientific classification
- Kingdom: Animalia
- Phylum: Chordata
- Class: Aves
- Order: Passeriformes
- Family: Cisticolidae
- Genus: Cisticola
- Species: C. bailunduensis

Binomial name
- Cisticola bailunduensis Neumann, 1931

Species of bird

The Huambo cisticola (Cisticola bailunduensis) is a species of bird in the family Cisticolidae that is endemic to western Angola in southern Central Africa. It is found in savanna and rocky areas. It was formerly considered to be conspecific with the rock-loving cisticola.

== Taxonomy ==
The Huambo cisticola was formally described in 1931 by the German ornithologist Oscar Neumann based on specimens collected near the town of Bailundo in the province of Huambo in central Angola. He considered his specimens to be from a subspecies of Cisticola emini that had been described by Anton Reichenow in 1892 and coined the trinomial name Cisticola emini bailunduensis. The taxa Cisticola emini is now treated as a subspecies of the rock-loving cisticola but the Huambo cisticola is considered to be a separate species and is monotypic.

== Description ==
It is a medium-sized cisticola with an overall length of 13–14 cm (5.1–5.5 in). It has a rufous face, whitish supercilium and rufous crown. The upperparts are dark brown and the underparts are buffish.
