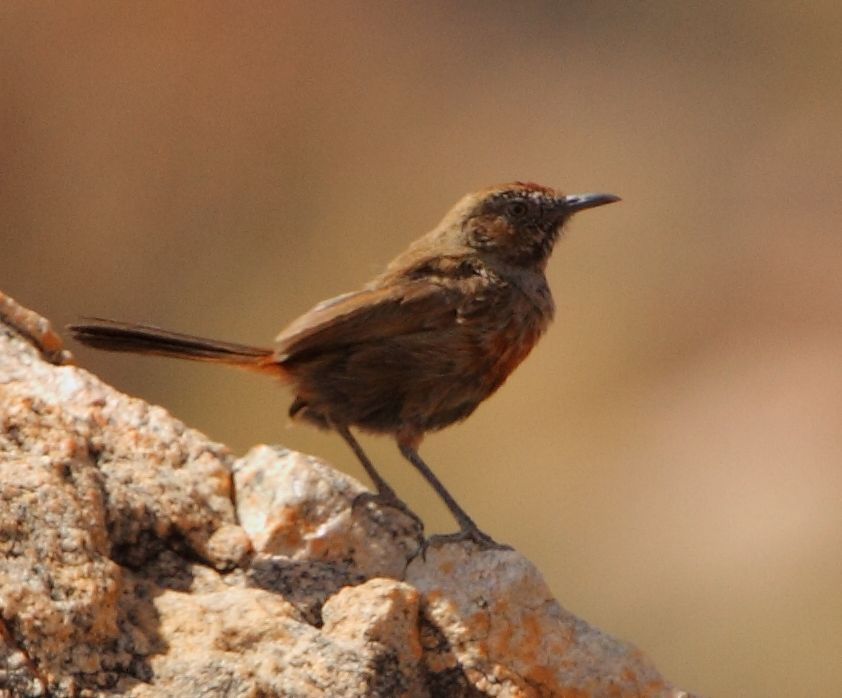
- In Northern Cape, South Africa

Conservation status
- Least Concern (IUCN 3.1)

Scientific classification
- Kingdom: Animalia
- Phylum: Chordata
- Class: Aves
- Order: Passeriformes
- Family: Cisticolidae
- Genus: Euryptila; Sharpe, 1883
- Species: E. subcinnamomea

Binomial name
- Euryptila subcinnamomea (Smith, 1847)

= Cinnamon-breasted warbler =

Species of bird

The cinnamon-breasted warbler or kopje warbler (Euryptila subcinnamomea) is a species of bird in the family Cisticolidae. It is the only species placed in the genus Euryptila. It is found in Namibia and South Africa. Its natural habitat is subtropical or tropical dry shrubland.
