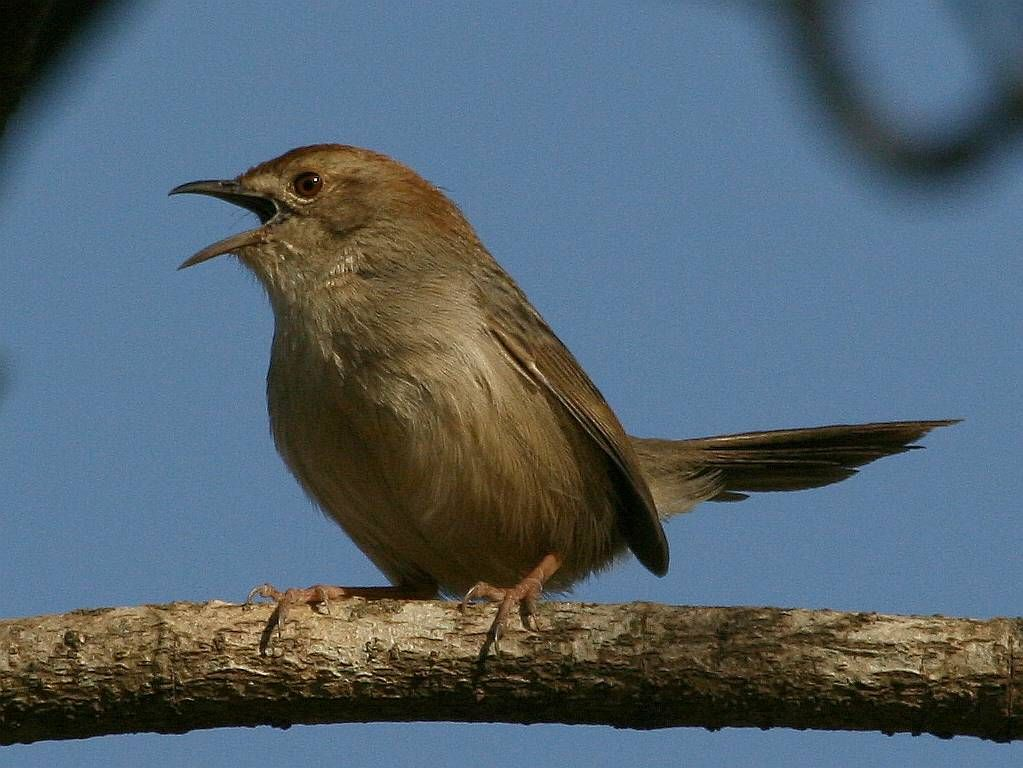
- Cisticola aberrans minor, Pietermaritzburg, South Africa

Conservation status
- Least Concern (IUCN 3.1)

Scientific classification
- Domain: Eukaryota
- Kingdom: Animalia
- Phylum: Chordata
- Class: Aves
- Order: Passeriformes
- Family: Cisticolidae
- Genus: Cisticola
- Species: C. aberrans

Binomial name
- Cisticola aberrans (Smith, A, 1843)

= Rock-loving cisticola =

Species of bird

The rock-loving cisticola (Cisticola aberrans), also known as the lazy cisticola, is a species of bird in the family Cisticolidae. It is widespread throughout sub-Saharan Africa and is usually associated with rocky wooded terrain with interspersed patchy grass tussocks. It was formerly considered to be conspecific with the Huambo cisticola (Cisticola bailunduensis).

== Taxonomy ==
The rock-loving cisticola was formally described and illustrated in 1843 by the Scottish zoologist Andrew Smith under the binomial name Drymoica aberrans based on specimens collected near "Port Natal" (now Durban) in South Africa. The specific epithet is from Latin aberrans, aberrantis meaning "deviating" or "aberrant". The rock-loving cisticola is now one of 53 cisticolas placed in the genus Cisticola that was introduced in 1829 by the German naturalist Johann Jakob Kaup.

Seven subspecies are recognised:

- C. a. admiralis Bates, GL, 1930 – south Mauritania to Mali, Ghana and Sierra Leone
- C. a. petrophilus Alexander, 1907 – north Nigeria to southwest Sudan, northeast DR Congo, Uganda, Rwanda and Burundi
- C. a. emini Reichenow, 1892 – south Kenya and north Tanzania
- C. a. nyika Lynes, 1930 – Zambia and southwest Tanzania to west Malawi, Zimbabwe and west Mozambique
- C. a. lurio Vincent, 1933 – east Malawi and north Mozambique
- C. a. aberrans (Smith, A, 1843) – southeast Botswana and central South Africa
- C. a. minor Roberts, 1913 – south Mozambique and east South Africa

The first three subspecies on the above list (admiralis, petrophilus and emini) have sometimes been considered as a separate species with the English name "rock-loving cisticola" while the other taxa were known as the "lazy cistola". The Huambo cisticola (Cisticola bailunduensis) from Angola was formerly treated as another subspecies but is now considered to be a separate species based on the differences in vocalization, morphology and ecology.

== Description ==
The rock-loving cisticola is a medium sized cisticola with an overall length of 13–14 cm (5.1–5.5 in). It has a plain brown back, a long slender tail, a grey-brown face, a whitish supercilium and a rufous crown. The underparts are whitish.
