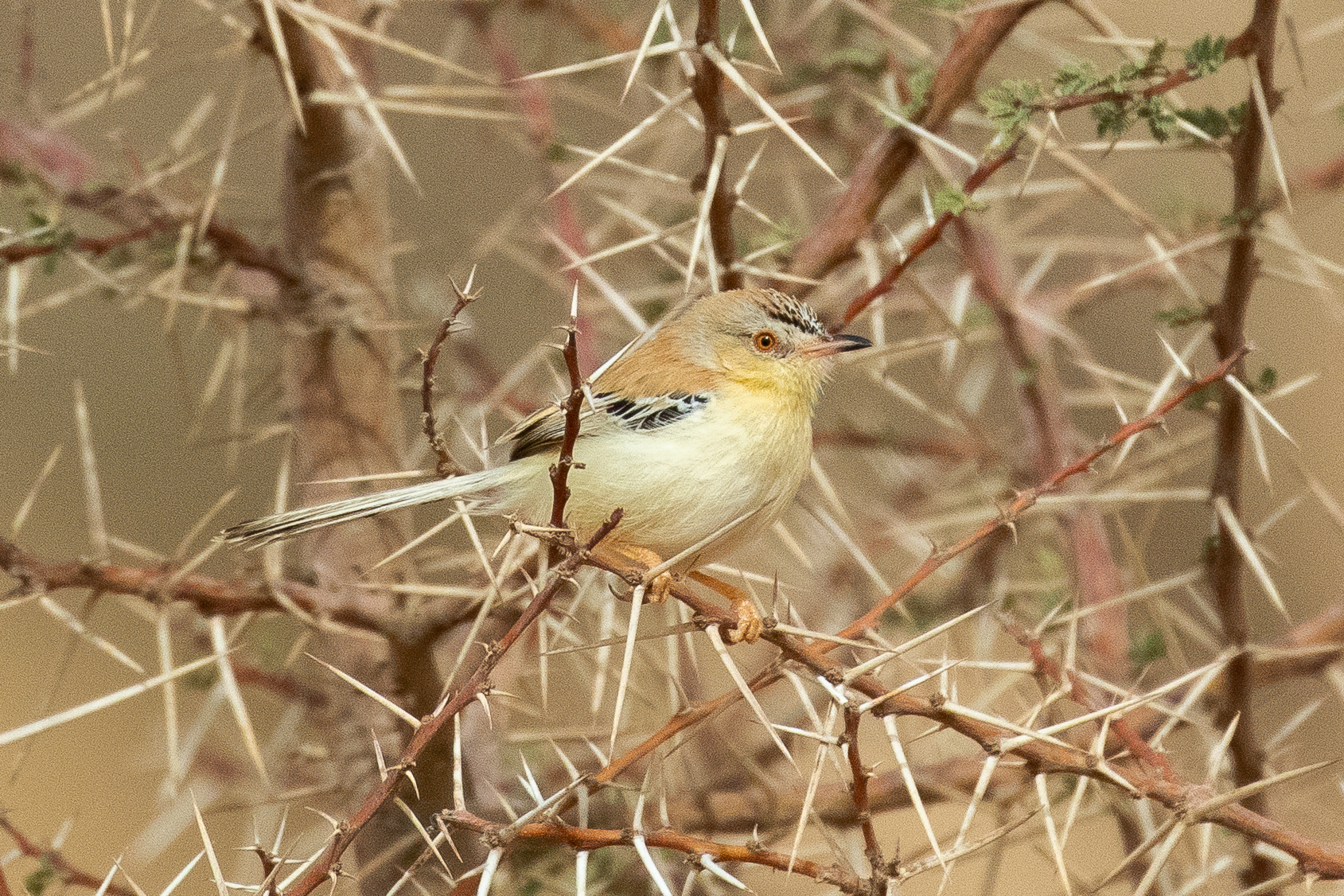

Conservation status
- Least Concern (IUCN 3.1)

Scientific classification
- Kingdom: Animalia
- Phylum: Chordata
- Class: Aves
- Order: Passeriformes
- Family: Cisticolidae
- Genus: Spiloptila; Sundevall, 1872
- Species: S. clamans

Binomial name
- Spiloptila clamans (Cretzschmar, 1826)

= Cricket warbler =

Species of bird

The cricket warbler (Spiloptila clamans), also known as cricket longtail, scaly longtail or cricket prinia, is a species of bird in the family Cisticolidae. It belongs to the genus Spiloptila; it is often the only species included in the genus but sometimes the red-fronted prinia is placed there as well.

== Description ==
The cricket warbler is a small, perky warbler with a long tail made up of twelve grey, black and white tipped feathers with the feathers getting longer from the outside to the centre, creating a graduated tail. It is pale buffy rufous on the upperparts, with black streaks on the crown and black tips to the primaries and upper wing coverts, a pale yellow rump, a white supercilium and whitish cream underparts. The male has a greyer cast across the nape. 9–10 cm in length.

== Distribution ==
The cricket warbler occurs in the Sahel Zone from southern Mauritania and northern Senegal east to South Sudan and northern Eritrea. They have recently been found breeding in the Western Sahara at Oued Jenna near Aousserd.

== Habitat ==
The cricket warbler breeds in thorn scrub, especially acacia scrub, it even extends into true desert so long as there is sufficient vegetation and into savanna with broad-leafed trees but avoids grassy plains or dense bush.

== Habits ==
The cricket warbler is quite a sociable species and is usually seen in small parties of around half a dozen birds which move restlessly from one patch of low scrub to another. When on the ground or perched it moves its tail jerkily up and down and side to side, while making its monotonous cricket like call. It usually sings from a high perch. They feed on insects which are foraged for low down in thorn scrub or in tussocks of grass. It is a partial migrant, with the northern populations moving southwards in the dry season, returning north with the rains. Breeding has been recorded in July in Mali and Mauritania, all year in Senegal and in January to April and again in August in south Sudan.
