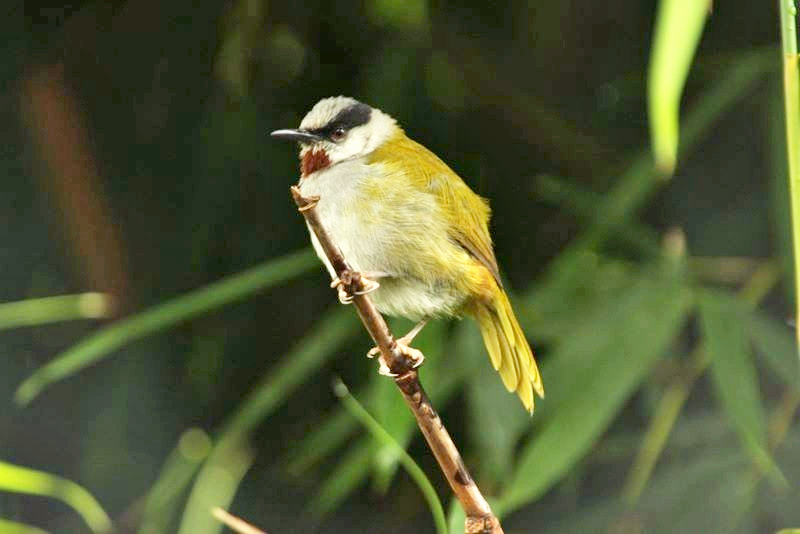
- In East Africa Song recorded in Chepareria, Kenya

Conservation status
- Least Concern (IUCN 3.1)

Scientific classification
- Kingdom: Animalia
- Phylum: Chordata
- Class: Aves
- Order: Passeriformes
- Family: Cisticolidae
- Genus: Eminia; Hartlaub, 1881
- Species: E. lepida

Binomial name
- Eminia lepida Hartlaub, 1881

= Grey-capped warbler =

Species of bird

The grey-capped warbler (Eminia lepida) is a species of bird in the family Cisticolidae. It is monotypic (only species) in the genus Eminia. The grey-capped warbler is found in Burundi, Democratic Republic of the Congo, Kenya, Rwanda, South Sudan, Tanzania, and Uganda. It is a large, chunky, thin-tailed-warbler with a distinctive grey cap, a black band around its head, and a chestnut throat wrapping its neck. Grey-capped warblers maintain a diet of insects and other invertebrates, including caterpillars, moths, grasshoppers, and mantids.

== Identification ==
The grey-capped warbler is roughly 15 cm in length, and weighs 16–24 grams. It is typically chunky and thin-tailed with a distinctive grey cap, a black band around the head, and a chestnut throat with rump feathers that are long and lax. Its cheek, neck, and underparts are grey and it is tinged olive-green on the flanks and under tail-coverts. Grey-capped warblers have a chestnut vent patch and upperparts. The tail and the median and greater upper wing-coverts are olive-green. The lesser coverts and underwing-coverts are chestnut. Flight-feathers are dark brown (edged olive-green). The irises are reddish-brown, the bill and mouth are black, and the legs are pinkish-brown. Identification for sexes is similar. Younger grey-capped warblers are duller than adults and have a smaller, paler throat patch and brown eyes. Recently fledged warblers have a prominent yellow gape and shorter tail.

== Habitat ==
The natural habitat of the grey-capped warbler is subtropical or moist tropical shrubland. It is found in dense undergrowth, scrub, and creepers, usually in damp areas along forest edges, seeps, or riparian strips, as well as around well-planted gardens. It is confined to areas with annual rainfall exceeding 500 mm. It usually dwells in areas at altitudes from 800 m to 2,500 m in Kenya. It is regarded as a sedentary bird.

== Diet and Foraging ==
Its diet includes insects and other invertebrates, including caterpillars and moths (Lepidoptera), grasshoppers (Orthoptera), mantids (Mantodea), spiders (Araneae), and millipedes (Diplopoda). It forages by gleaning from foliage and bark, actively searching among dead, curled-up leaves, crevices in bark, and holes in twigs. It is secretive and lurks among dense vegetation, and may easily be overlooked if not singing. It is joined by a large variety of frugivorous and insectivorous species attracted to stands of fruiting Euclea divinorum trees in Tanzania.

== Sounds and Vocal Behavior ==
Male songs usually come from an exposed perch, mainly during the breeding season, making a loud, varied series of trills and whistles, lasting 6–20 seconds, typically containing several repeated elements uttered every 30 seconds. The female utters a dry trill with up to 7 notes per second, usually during the male song in a duet. The male also utters trilling calls, alarms with a soft "pree", or louder scolding calls when agitated.

== Breeding ==
The grey-capped warbler breeds during rains: Mar-Jun and Oct–Nov in Sudan and DR Congo, Apr-May in Uganda, and May–Aug and Nov–Jan in Kenya. It attempts multiple broods. Possibly monogamous, partners apparently remain together throughout the year, being solitary and territorial. When singing together, partners sit close together or hop around each other, with throat feathers raised and their tail fanned and erect. Once the duet ends, the male bends forward, holding his back, rump, and flank feathers raised in the manner of a puff back (Dryoscopus). Nests are built by both sexes, with the male sometimes calling while the female builds. Construction of a nest usually takes 2 weeks. The nest is an untidy, ball-shaped structure, with a side entrance and protruding porch (up to 8 cm long) and platform (2·5 cm), made of long strips of fibrous vegetation and leaves, woven together and lined with moss, spider webs, rootlets, feathers and plant down, suspended from a thin branch or creeper inside dense vegetation, sometimes slung between two saplings, usually, 1–3 m (rarely 5 m) up, often over water, where it resembles debris lodged in the overhanging branch. The nest is sometimes re-used in successive seasons; one record of a weaver (Ploceidae) nest being used after entrance modified and long, trailing vegetation added to enhance camouflage. The clutch includes 2 or 3 eggs incubated mainly by the female for 12–13 days. Chicks are fed by both sexes, the male often passing food to the female and she then feeds the nestlings. Both sexes also remove feces, dropping them some distance away from the nest. The fledging period is 16 days with the adults accompanying the fledglings, calling loudly if approached. Breeding success is low, averaging only 0·27 broods/pair/year in Kenya (multiple attempts during a protracted breeding season) with some streamside nests destroyed by floodwaters.
