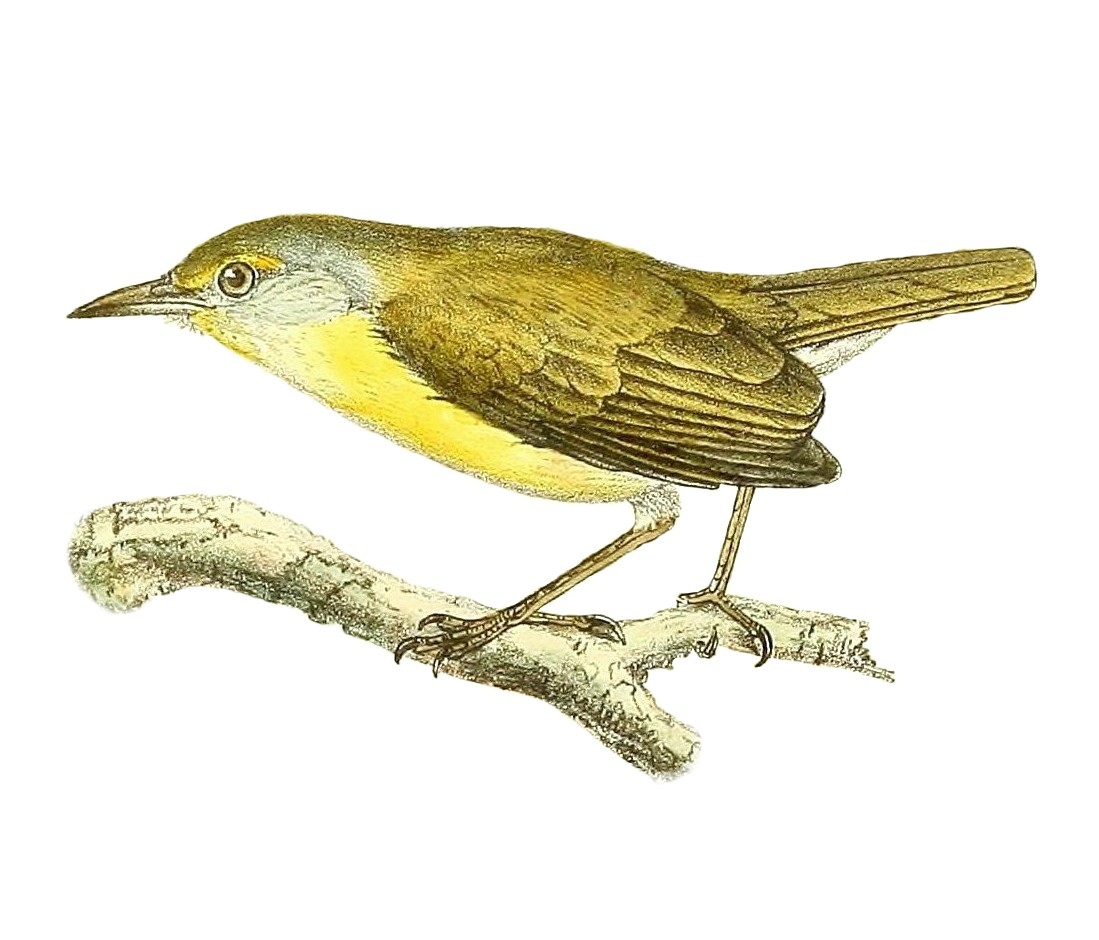
- Common jery (Neomixis tenella)

Scientific classification
- Kingdom: Animalia
- Phylum: Chordata
- Class: Aves
- Order: Passeriformes
- Family: Cisticolidae
- Genus: Neomixis; Sharpe, 1881

Type species
- Neomixis striatigula Sharpe, 1881
- Native range of Neomixis striatigula

= Neomixis =

Genus of birds

Neomixis is a genus of small forest birds that are endemic to Madagascar.

The genus was introduced by the English zoologist Richard Bowdler Sharpe in 1881. The type species is the stripe-throated jery (Neomixis striatigula). The genus was formerly placed in the Old World babbler family but is now considered to belong to the family Cisticolidae.

== Species ==
The genus includes three species:

Image	Scientific name	Common name	Distribution
	Neomixis striatigula	Stripe-throated jery	eastern Madagascar
	Neomixis tenella	Common jery	Madagascar
	Neomixis viridis	Green jery	eastern Madagascar

Another species the wedge-tailed jery (Hartertula flavoviridis) was until recently placed in this genus but biochemical studies suggest its true relationships lie elsewhere.
