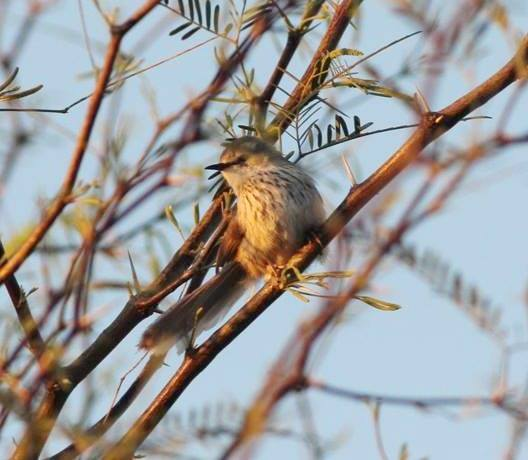
- At Brandvlei, Northern Cape, South Africa

Conservation status
- Least Concern (IUCN 3.1)

Scientific classification
- Kingdom: Animalia
- Phylum: Chordata
- Class: Aves
- Order: Passeriformes
- Family: Cisticolidae
- Genus: Phragmacia; Brooke & Dean, 1990
- Species: P. substriata

Binomial name
- Phragmacia substriata (Smith, 1842)

= Namaqua warbler =

Species of bird

The Namaqua warbler (Phragmacia substriata), also known as the Namaqua prinia or white-breasted prinia, is a small passerine bird, a cisticolid warbler and the sole member of the genus Phragmacia. It was formerly placed in the genus Prinia, but was found to be sufficiently distinct to warrant a genus of its own.

== Description ==
The Namaqua warbler is 12–13 cm long, with short rounded wings, a long tail, strong legs and a short straight black bill. The head has a whitish eyebrow and the upperparts are otherwise a rich russet brown. The throat and lower face are whitish with no streaking, and the breast is white with faint streaking. The rear flanks are buff. The long, brown tail is typically cocked up at an angle. The feet and legs are pinkish-brown, and the eye is brown. The sexes are identical, but juveniles are duller than the adults. The calls include a high-pitched treeep-treep-trrrrrr.

The Namaqua warbler can only be confused with the Karoo prinia, but that species has a shorter, less whispy tail, duller brown back and buff tips to the undertail feathers.

== Distribution and habitat ==
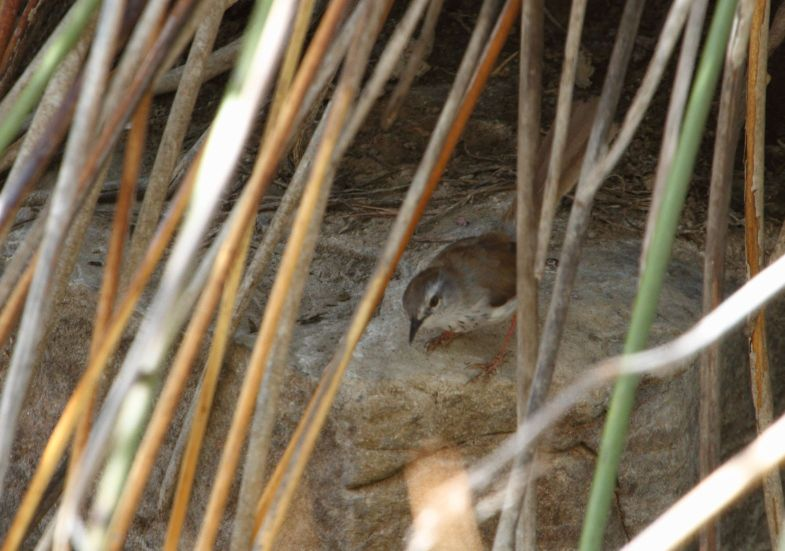
Namaqua warbler in typical habitat; dense cover in a Karoo watercourse

This is a resident breeder in western South Africa and southern Namibia. It is a species endemic to the Karoo in thick bushes in dry river gullies and reedbeds near rivers and dams.

== Behaviour ==
The warbler is usually seen in pairs or small groups, typically low in scrub, foraging for small insects, with tail cocked.

== Conservation status ==
This common species has a large range, with an estimated extent of 380,000 km². The population size is believed to be large, and the species is not believed to approach the thresholds for the population decline criterion of the IUCN Red List (i.e. declining more than 30% in ten years or three generations). For these reasons, the species is evaluated as least concern.
