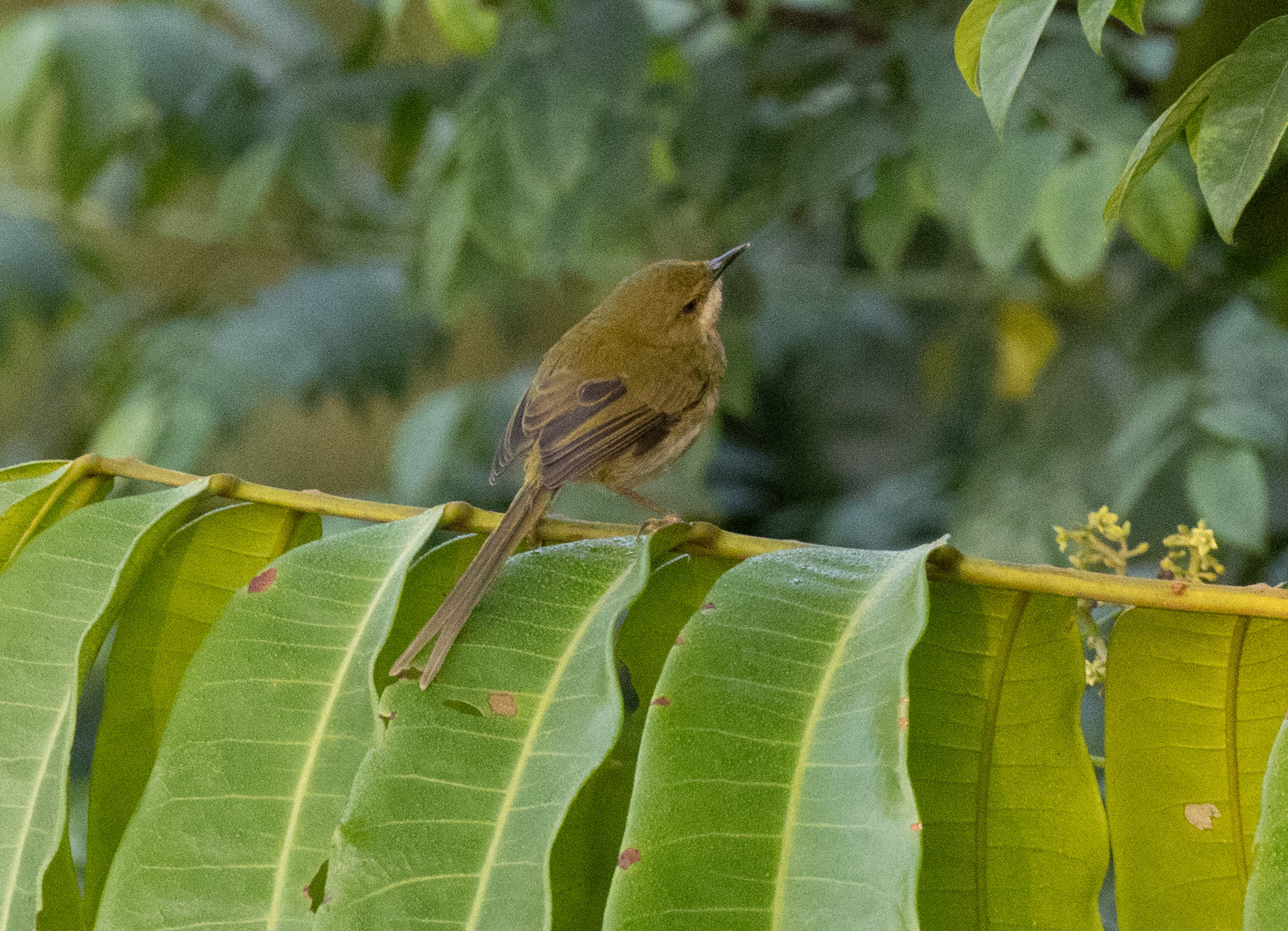

Conservation status
- Least Concern (IUCN 3.1)

Scientific classification
- Kingdom: Animalia
- Phylum: Chordata
- Class: Aves
- Order: Passeriformes
- Family: Cisticolidae
- Genus: Urolais; Alexander, 1903
- Species: U. epichlorus

Binomial name
- Urolais epichlorus (Reichenow, 1892)

= Green longtail =

Species of bird

The green longtail (Urolais epichlorus) is a bird species of the family Cisticolidae, in the monotypic genus Urolais. It is native to the Western High Plateau and the Cameroonian Highlands forests. Its natural habitats are subtropical or tropical moist montane forest and dry savanna.
