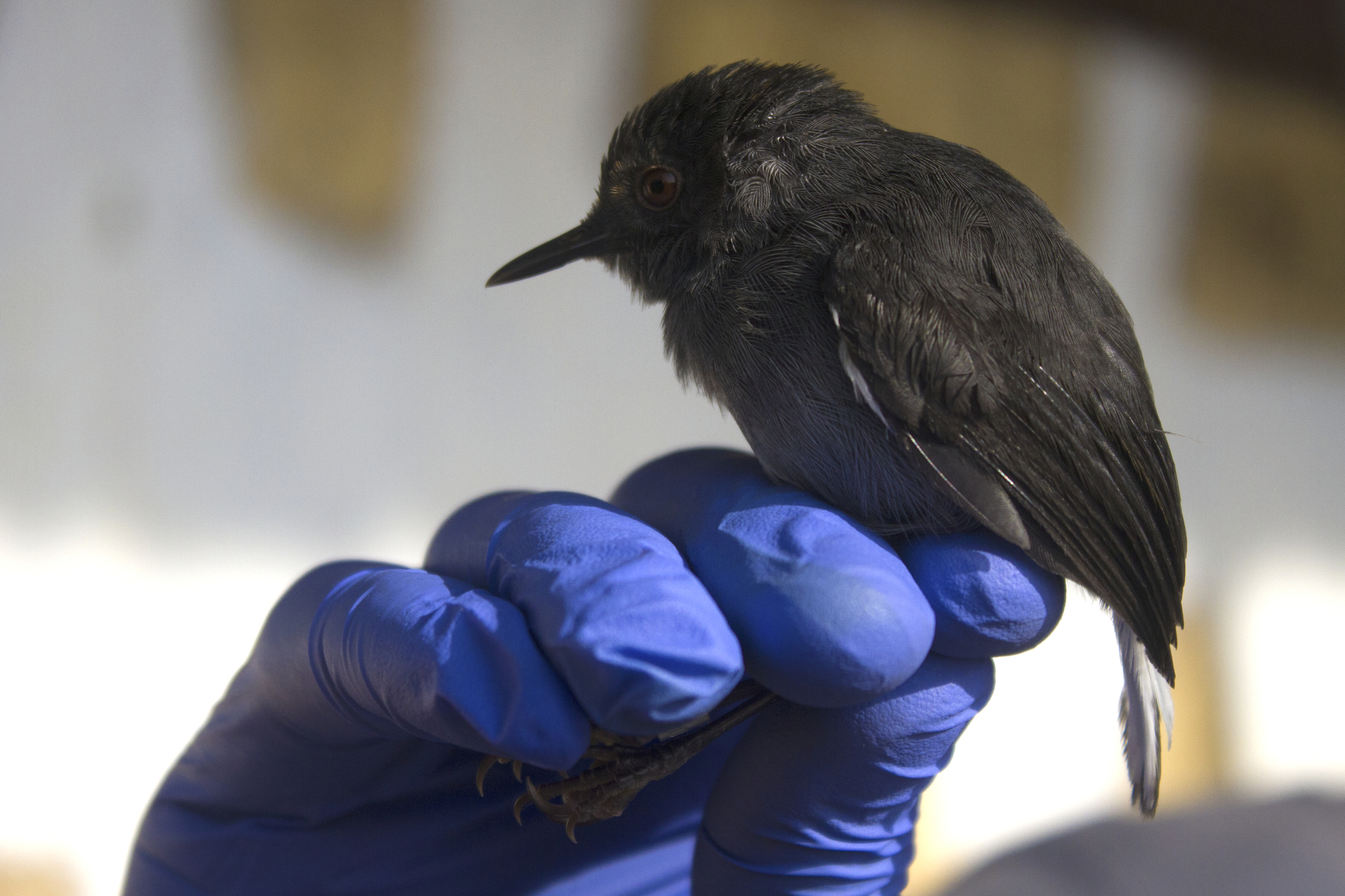
- Male
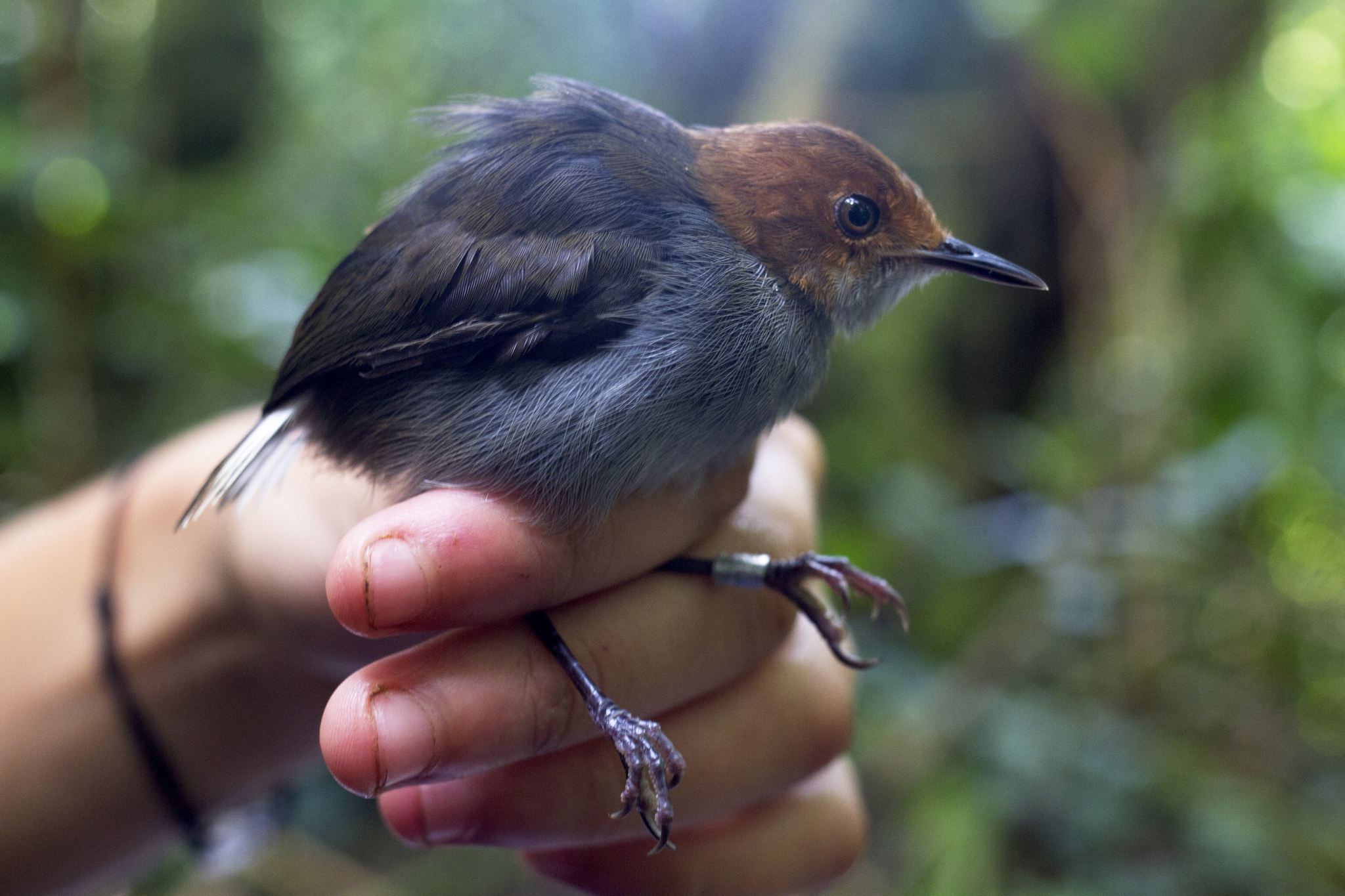
- Female

Conservation status
- Least Concern (IUCN 3.1)

Scientific classification
- Kingdom: Animalia
- Phylum: Chordata
- Class: Aves
- Order: Passeriformes
- Family: Cisticolidae
- Genus: Poliolais; Alexander, 1903
- Species: P. lopezi

Binomial name
- Poliolais lopezi (Alexander, 1903)

= White-tailed warbler =

Species of bird

The white-tailed warbler (Poliolais lopezi) is a species of bird in the family Cisticolidae, the only species of the genus Poliolais. It is native to the Western High Plateau and Bioko.

Its natural habitat is subtropical or tropical moist montane forest. It is becoming rare due to habitat loss.
