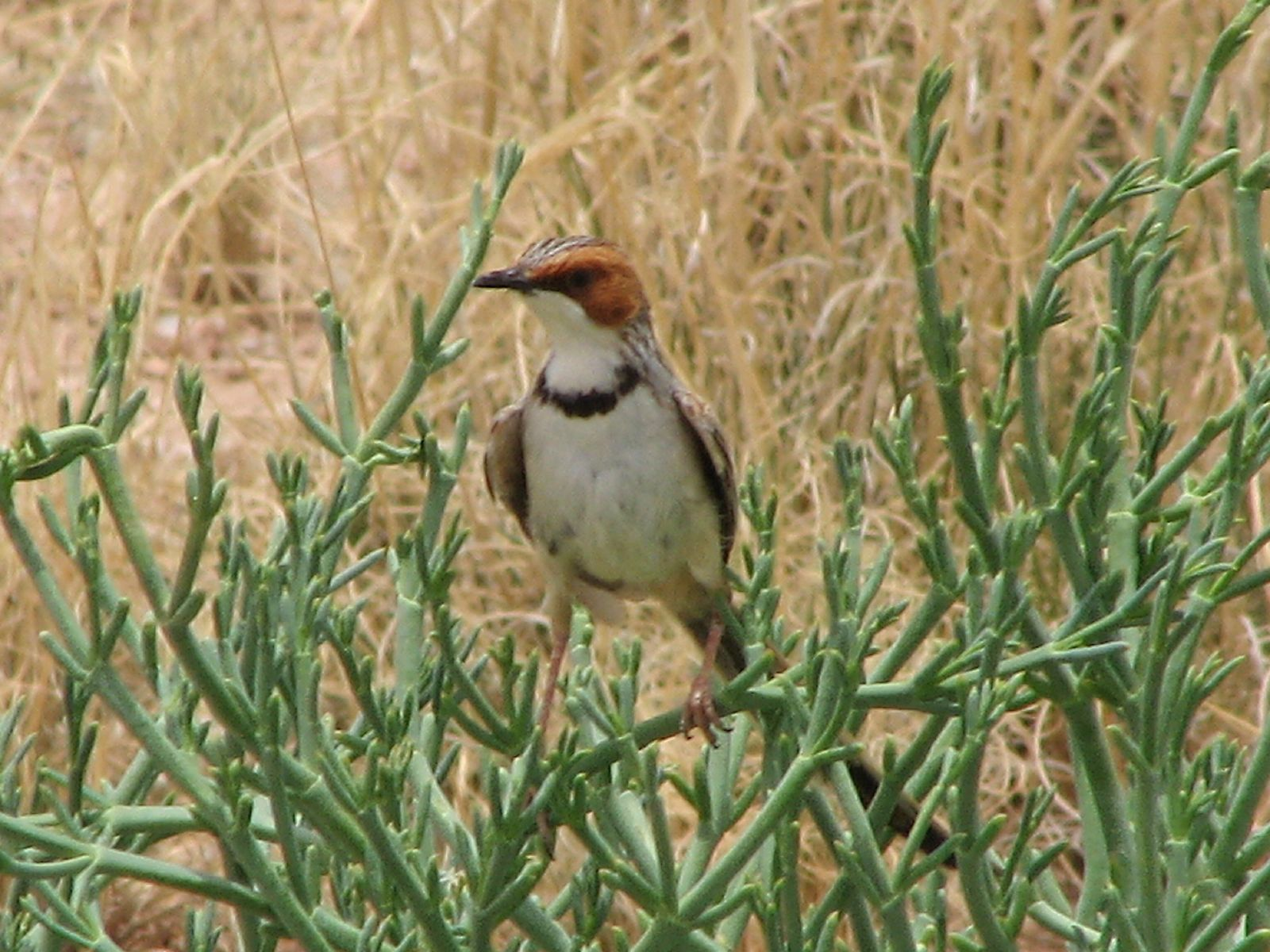

Conservation status
- Least Concern (IUCN 3.1)

Scientific classification
- Kingdom: Animalia
- Phylum: Chordata
- Class: Aves
- Order: Passeriformes
- Family: Cisticolidae
- Genus: Malcorus; A. Smith, 1829
- Species: M. pectoralis

Binomial name
- Malcorus pectoralis A. Smith, 1829

= Rufous-eared warbler =

Species of bird

The rufous-eared warbler (Malcorus pectoralis) is a species of bird in the family Cisticolidae. It is found in Botswana, Namibia, and South Africa. It is the only species in the genus Malcorus. Its natural habitats are subtropical or tropical dry shrubland and subtropical or tropical dry lowland grassland.

== Taxonomy and systematics ==
The rufous-eared warbler was first described by Andrew Smith in 1829. It belongs to the genus Malcorus, a monotypic genus that occurs in the arid zones of western southern Africa.

The taxonomy of the rufous-eared warbler has been debated, with it sometimes being grouped with crombecs, the grassbirds or the prinias. It has most recently been grouped within the family Cisticolidae. It had previously been placed in the genus Prinia, but has since been placed in its own genus due to morphological, behavioural and genetic differences. Its closest relatives are a group of other monotypic warblers, including the black-faced rufous warbler (Bathmocercus rufus), the Socotra warbler (Incana incana), the oriole warbler (Hypergerus atriceps), the grey-capped warbler (Eminia lepida), Winifred's warbler (also known as Mrs Moreau's warbler, Scepomycter winifredae) and the cinnamon-breasted warbler (Euryptila subcinnamomea).

The rufous-eared warbler is also known as the rufous-eared prinia and the rooioorlangstertjie (Afrikaans).

=== Subspecies ===
There are three recognised subspecies of rufous-eared warbler: M. p. pectoralis, M. p. ocularius and M. p. etoshae. The nominate sub-species, M. p. pectoralis occurs in the southern reaches of the species distribution range in South Africa. Smith later described the subspecies M. p. ocularis in 1843, occurring in southern Namibia, southern Botswana and in the northern regions of the South African distribution. In 1965 a third subspecies, M. p. etoshae, was described by Winterbottom, occurring in northern Namibia.

== Description ==
The rufous-eared warbler is a small passerine bird that gets its name from its distinct rufous-coloured ear-patches. The head and rear of the neck are brown and streaked with dark red while the belly and neck are greyish white, with a variable black breast-band that is absent from adults during winter. The mantle and back are mottled with greyish brown and blackish brown. The eyes are described as reddish hazel, with pinkish legs and a black bill measuring 11–13 mm. The tail is long and thin, and is often held upright over the body. The tail is made up of a total of 10 paired tail feathers, with the outer feathers up to 5.6 cm shorter than the central tail feathers. The birds are small, measuring around 15 cm in length with males weighing 10-12 g and females weighing 9-11 g.

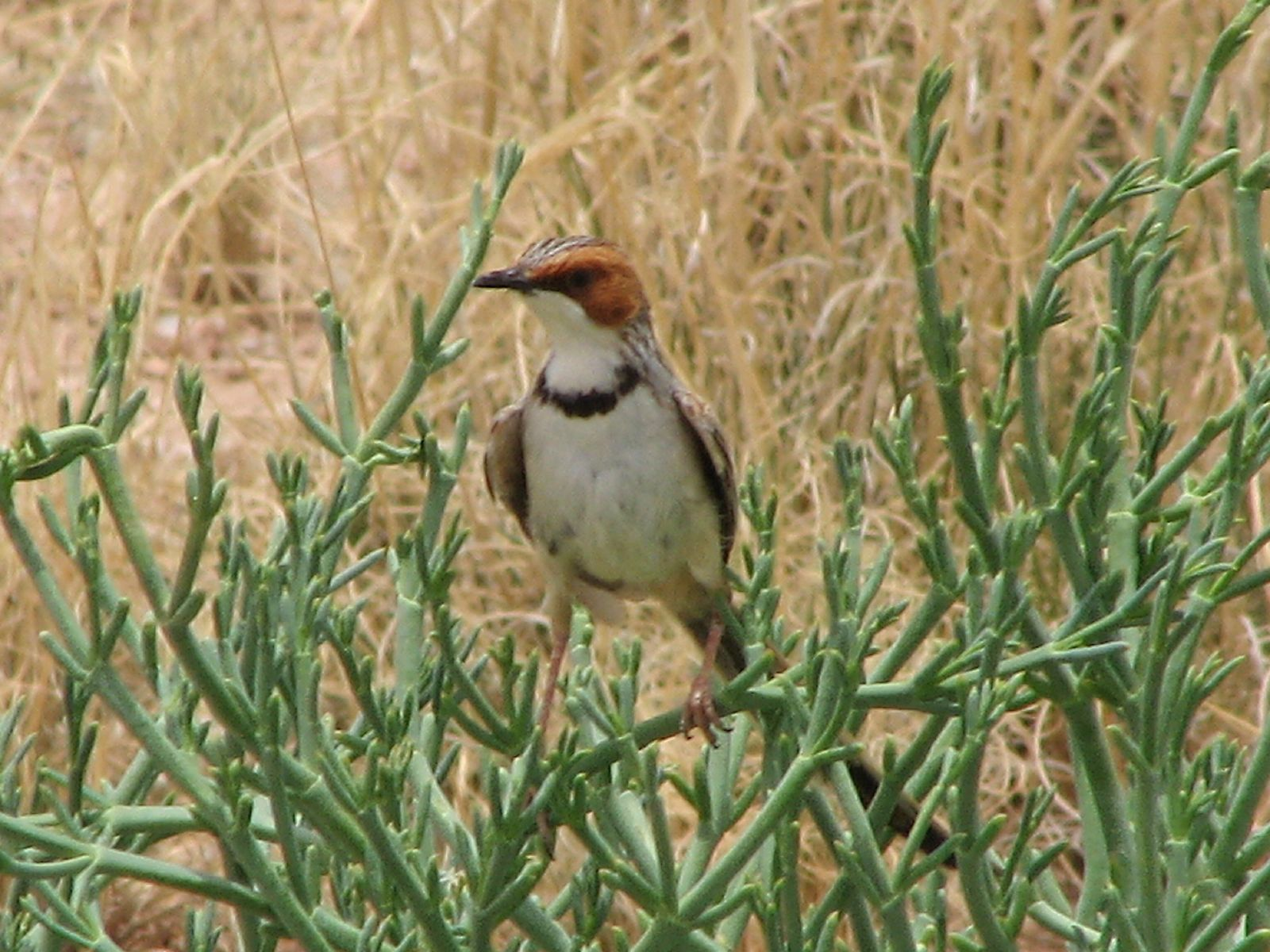
Image of a male rufous-eared warbler, showing clearly visible black breast band.

Although the sexes are similar in appearance the rufous-eared warblers are one of the few species of the family Cisticolidae that display sexual dimorphism, with female birds having paler ear-patches and a narrower breast-band than the males. Juveniles are paler, with a whiter belly and a narrower or absent breast-band. The subspecies M. p. ocularis is paler in colour, with a more tawny face and whiter under parts. M. p etoshae is even paler than M. p. ocularis, with wing-edges yellowish.

== Distribution and habitat ==
The rufous-eared warbler has a widespread distribution in southern Africa, where it is endemic. Although the global population size is not currently known, the bird is listed as Least Concern (LC) on the IUCN Red List due to its large range. It is native to Botswana, Namibia and South Africa. It is an arid-zone bird, occurring in arid and semi-arid areas with scrubby bushes and open grassland interspersed with bushy vegetation on plains and slopes. It is absent from Acacia karoo woodland and from the Namib desert, but it does occur along the edges of the Namib desert in shrubs and drainage lines. It favours low scrub Karoo habitats.

The rufous-eared warbler is generally a resident bird, but will occasionally move following rainfall events. Populations in arid areas do not show large fluctuations during periods of low rainfall or drought, which indicates that they will generally opt to stay in one area rather move during adverse conditions.

== Behavior and ecology ==
=== Social behavior and calls ===
The rufous-eared warbler tends to occur in pairs of small family groups, particularly after the breeding season, and is seldom found on its own. It has a tinkling call, described as a "tzee tzee tzee tzee" or "zeep zeep zeep zeep", which is repeated with variations in phrase length and intensity to call communicatively, territorially and in alarm. It will also use the alarm call "peeee". Male birds will call from a vantage point, often perching on the top of low shrubs.

The birds are generally shy, and will hide deep within bushes.

=== Food and feeding ===
The rufous-eared warbler is predominantly insectivorous, feeding on shield bugs, plant hoppers, beetles, termites, ants, moths and spiders. They will incorporate seeds and fruits into the diet_{,} as well as insect larvae. Generally, they tend to favour small beetles as a primary food source. Stomach content analyses have found evidence of feeding on termites, weevils, caterpillars, beetles, plant hoppers, coccids, bugs, ants, grasshoppers, species of Araneae and Acari as well as the vegetation, fruit and seeds of certain Solanacea, Asparagaceae and Amaranthaceae species. Feeding is predominantly carried out on the ground and in low shrubs where they will glean insects from the foliage.

The rufous-eared warbler spends a large portion of time on the ground, and will run between patches of cover. It often flies between patches of scrubby vegetation low to the ground, and as a result it may be mistaken for a rodent.

=== Breeding ===
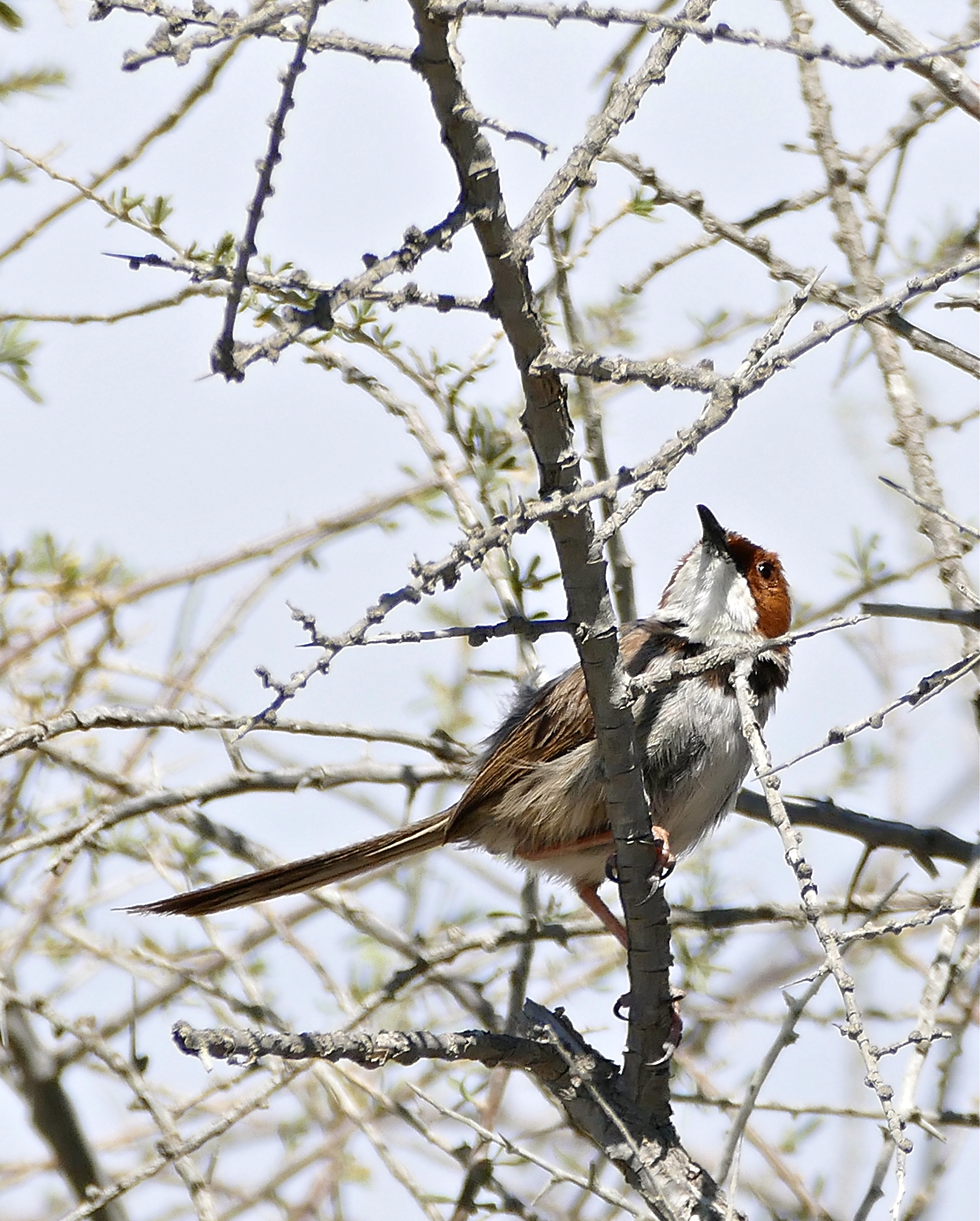
Rufous-eared warbler perching in a non-thorny shrub

Breeding tends to occur in late summer (January - March) in South Africa, but also in July and October in Botswana, and is generally opportunistic, following periods of rainfall. During the breeding season, male birds are solitary and territorial, and will perch on the top of bushes and call to attract females. When a female is attracted to the bush, a courtship display will ensue where the male birds jerk the body and tail and flutter the wings, and females flick their wings in response.

The nest is a messy oval structure constructed from grass stems, leaves and/or strips of bark, and lined with soft vegetation before egg-laying. Birds will often use spider webs to bind the nest together before lining it. The nests have a side-top entrance. The rufous-eared warbler tends to favour non-thorny shrubs for nest-building, and nests are built 0.2-1.2 m off the ground, often facing east, southeast and south, which is associated with avoiding direct sunlight during the hottest hours of the day. It is thought to be monogamous, but will sometimes have helpers during the breeding season.

The eggs of the rufous-eared warbler are small and pale blue in color. Usually 3-7 eggs are laid in the nest, each measuring 11 x 15 mm. The roles of the sexes are undetermined during the incubation period, which lasts for 12–13 days. If the incubating bird is disturbed while it is on the nest, it will drop to the ground.

The nestlings are born altricial, with black markings inside a yellow mouth cavity. The offspring are fed in the nest and develop feathers during this period. The young are fed by both parents, mainly on grasshoppers and caterpillars. After 11 days the offspring are fully feathered and ready to leave the nest.

The eggs and nestlings suffer a high rate of predation, particularly from snakes and armoured bush crickets. The daily rate of predation can be as high as 4.4%, and certain observations have indicated that the rate of predation on nestlings is higher than the rate of predation on eggs.
