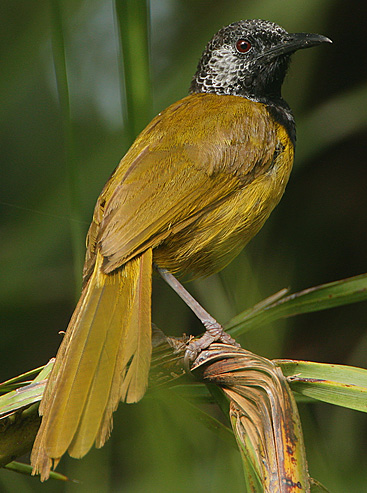

Conservation status
- Least Concern (IUCN 3.1)

Scientific classification
- Kingdom: Animalia
- Phylum: Chordata
- Class: Aves
- Order: Passeriformes
- Family: Cisticolidae
- Genus: Hypergerus; Reichenbach, 1850
- Species: H. atriceps

Binomial name
- Hypergerus atriceps (Lesson, 1831)

= Oriole warbler =

Species of bird

The oriole warbler (Hypergerus atriceps) is a large warbler in the family Cisticolidae, and the only member of the genus Hypergerus. This bird is a resident breeder in west Africa from southern Senegal to Cameroon.

This skulking passerine is typically found in dense thickets usually near water. The oriole warbler builds a large untidy nest suspended from palm leaves.

These 20-cm long warblers have a long tail, strong legs and a long black bill. At a weight of around 30 g (1.1 oz) the oriole warbler may be the largest of the species-rich Cisticolidae family. Adults are light olive above, yellow below and have a black hood. The species' name refers to their resemblance to the unrelated but similarly black and yellow orioles. The sexes are similar, but juveniles are duller.

Like most warblers, the oriole warbler is insectivorous. The song is a loud whistled duetted toooo-ooo-eee-oooo, oooo-ooo-eee-oooo. The male always leads the duet and the female answers, though this is done in a manner that is temporally rather loose.
