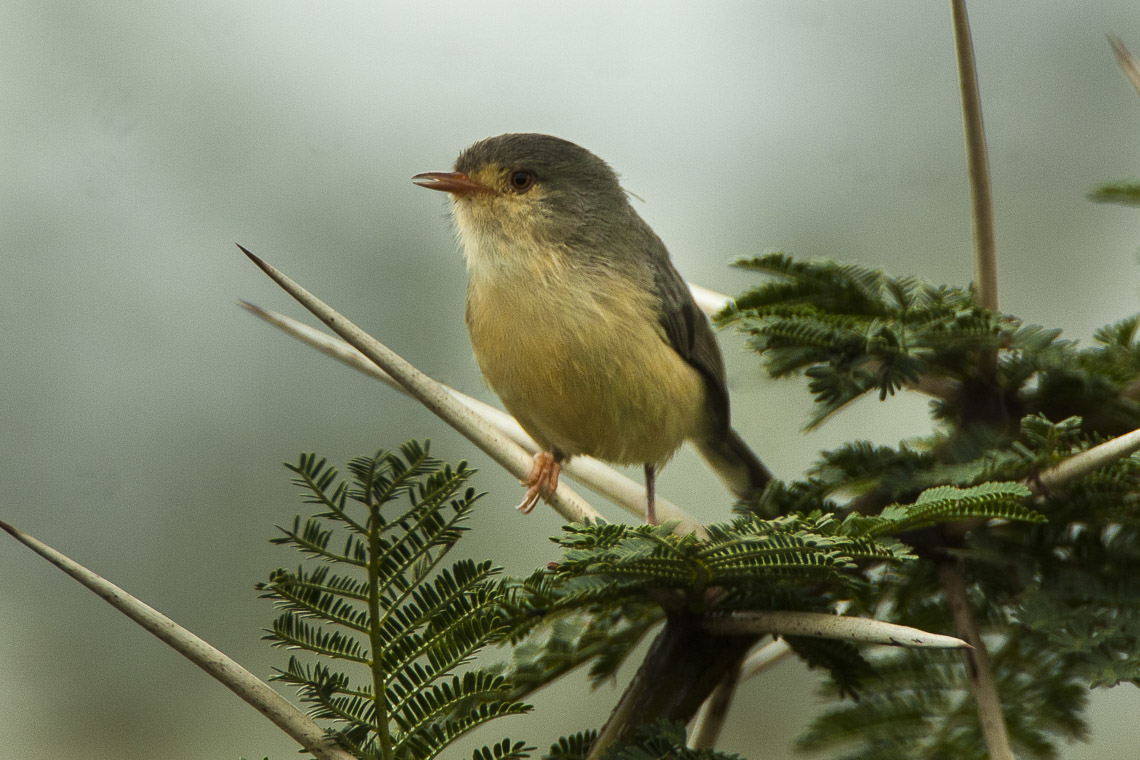
- In Kenya

Conservation status
- Least Concern (IUCN 3.1)

Scientific classification
- Kingdom: Animalia
- Phylum: Chordata
- Class: Aves
- Order: Passeriformes
- Family: Cisticolidae
- Genus: Phyllolais; Hartlaub, 1881
- Species: P. pulchella

Binomial name
- Phyllolais pulchella (Cretzschmar, 1830)

= Buff-bellied warbler =

Species of bird

The buff-bellied warbler (Phyllolais pulchella) is a species of bird in the family Cisticolidae. It is monotypic within the genus Phyllolais. It is found in Cameroon, Central African Republic, Chad, Democratic Republic of the Congo, Eritrea, Ethiopia, Kenya, Nigeria, Rwanda, Sudan, Tanzania, and Uganda, where its natural habitats are subtropical or tropical dry forest, dry savanna, and subtropical or tropical dry shrubland.

It is a small, dull coloured warbler found in savanna and acacia woodland. It particularly favours Acacia xanthophloea and Acacia abyssinica and can often be seen foraging among the branches in pairs or small groups. It is inconspicuous in its habits but can often be seen feeding in mix-species flocks.
