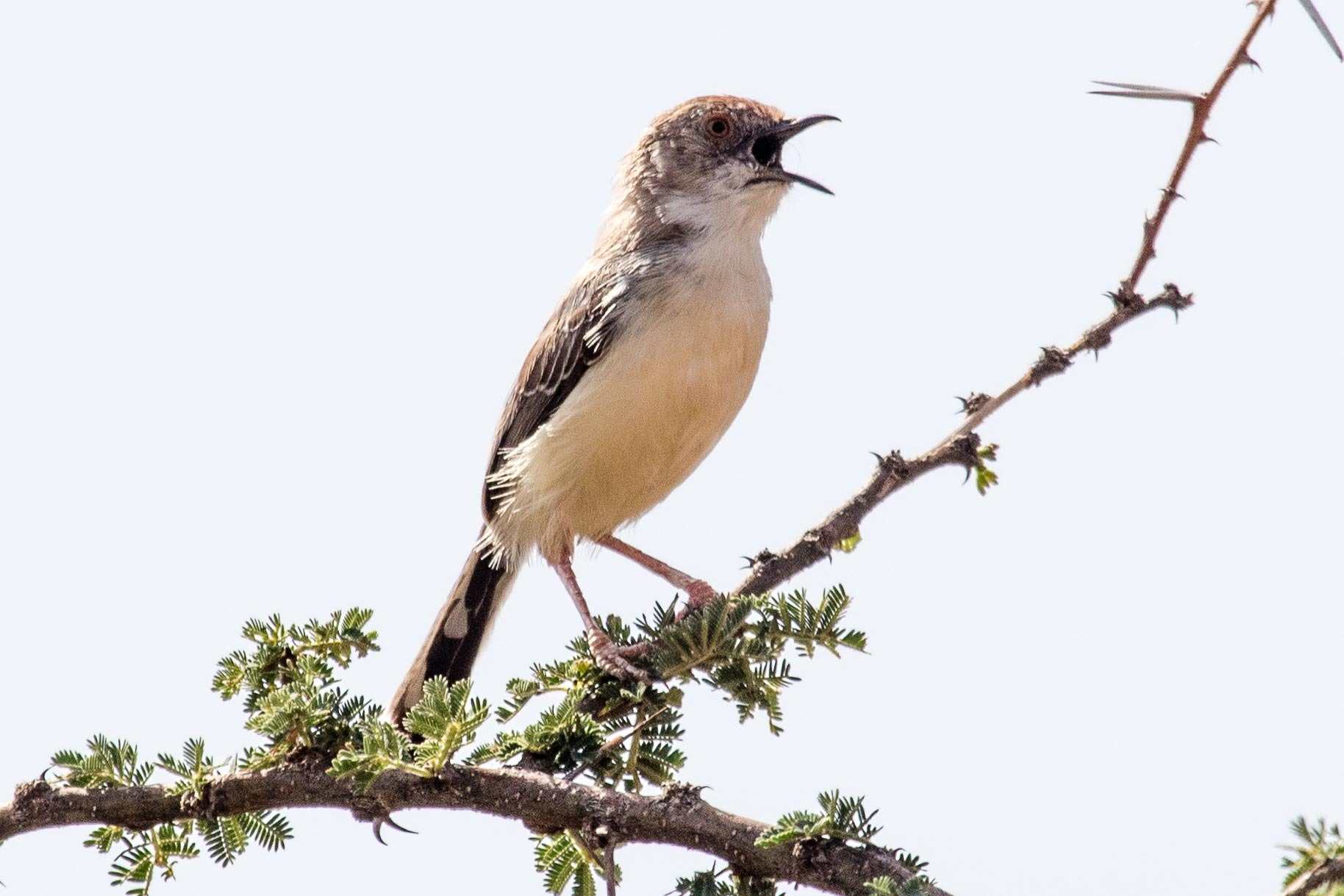

Conservation status
- Least Concern (IUCN 3.1)

Scientific classification
- Kingdom: Animalia
- Phylum: Chordata
- Class: Aves
- Order: Passeriformes
- Family: Cisticolidae
- Genus: Prinia
- Species: P. rufifrons

Binomial name
- Prinia rufifrons Rüppell, 1840

Synonyms
- Apalis rufifrons; Spiloptila rufifrons; Urorhipis rufifrons

= Red-fronted prinia =

Species of bird

The red-fronted prinia (Prinia rufifrons), also known as the red-fronted warbler and the red-faced apalis, is a species of bird in the family Cisticolidae. It is found in Chad, Djibouti, Eritrea, Ethiopia, Kenya, Somalia, Sudan, Tanzania, and Uganda. Its natural habitat is dry savanna.

== Taxonomy ==
The red-fronted prinia was described by the German naturalist Eduard Rüppell in 1840 under the binomial name Prinia rufifrons. The type locality is Eritrea (the coastal region of Abyssinia). The specific epithet rufifrons comes from the Latin rufus for "red" and frons for "forehead" or "front".

There are three subspecies:

- P. r. rufifrons Rüppell, 1840 – Chad to northwest Somalia
- P. r. smithi (Sharpe, 1895) – southeast Sudan to central Somalia and north Tanzania
- P. r. rufidorsalis (Sharpe, 1897) – southeast Kenya

Many taxonomists place this species in the genus Prinia rather than in its own monotypic genus Urorhipis. Support for this alternative placement is provided by a molecular phylogenetic study of the Cisticolidae published in 2013 that found that the red-fronted warbler was closely related to the prinias.
