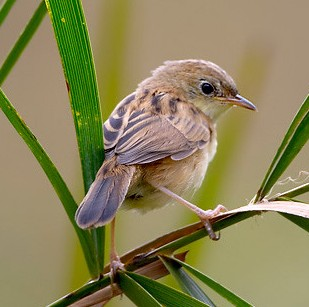
- Golden-headed cisticola (Cisticola exilis)

Scientific classification
- Kingdom: Animalia
- Phylum: Chordata
- Class: Aves
- Order: Passeriformes
- Parvorder: Sylviida
- Family: Cisticolidae; Sundevall, 1872

Genera
- Many: see text

= Cisticolidae =

Family of birds

The family Cisticolidae is a group of about 160 warblers, small passerine birds found mainly in warmer southern regions of the Old World. They were formerly included within the Old World warbler family Sylviidae.

This family probably originated in Africa, which has the majority of species, but there are representatives of the family across tropical Asia into Australasia, and one species, the zitting cisticola, breeds in Europe.

These are generally very small birds of drab brown or grey appearance found in open country such as grassland or scrub. They are often difficult to see and many species are similar in appearance, so the song is often the best identification guide. These are insectivorous birds which nest low in vegetation.

== Taxonomy ==
The family was introduced (as Cisticolinae) by the Swedish zoologist Carl Jakob Sundevall in 1872.

Many taxonomists place the red-winged prinia and the red-fronted prinia in the genus Prinia rather than in their own monotypic genera. Support for their placement in Prinia is provided by a molecular phylogenetic study of the Cisticolidae published in 2013 that found that both species were closely related to the prinias.

The following genus level cladogram of the Cisticolidae is based on a molecular phylogenetic study by Urban Olsson and collaborators that was published in 2013. The number of species in each genus is taken from the list maintained by Frank Gill, Pamela C. Rasmussen and David Donsker on behalf of the International Ornithological Committee (IOC).

- Cisticolidae
  - Neomixinae
    Neomixis – jerys (3 species)
  - - - Priniinae
        - Orthotomus – tailorbirds (13 species)
        - Prinia – prinias (30 species)
      - Cisticolinae
        - Cisticola – cisticolas (53 species)
        - - - Euryptila – cinnamon-breasted warbler
            - Scepomycter – Winifred's warbler
          - - Incana – Socotra warbler
            - - Malcorus – rufous-eared warbler
              - - Bathmocercus – rufous warblers (2 species)
                - - Hypergerus – oriole warbler
                  - Eminia – grey-capped warbler
    - Eremomelinae
      - Micromacronus – miniature babblers (2 species)
      - - Eremomela – eremolelas (10 species)
        - - - - Schistolais – prinias (2 species)
              - Drymocichla – red-winged grey warbler
            - - - Phragmacia – Namaqua warbler
                - Oreophilais – Roberts's warbler
              - - Urolais – green longtail
                - - Artisornis – forest warblers (2 species)
                  - Oreolais – apalises (2 species)
          - - - Poliolais – white-tailed warbler
              - - Calamonastes – wren-warblers (4 species)
                - Camaroptera – camaropteras (5 species)
            - - - Spiloptila – cricket warbler
                - Phyllolais – buff-bellied warbler
              - Apalis – apalises (25 species)

== List of genera ==
The family contains 168 species divided into 26 genera: For more detail, see List of Cisticolidae species.

- Neomixis, jeries (3 species) (genus is basal to all other Cisticolidae)
- Cisticola, cisticolas (53 species)
- Incana – monotypic, Socotra warbler (Incana incanus)
- Prinia, prinias (30 species)
- Schistolais (2 species)
- Phragmacia – monotypic, Namaqua warbler (Phragmacia substriata)
- Oreophilais – monotypic, Roberts's warbler (Oreophilais robertsi)

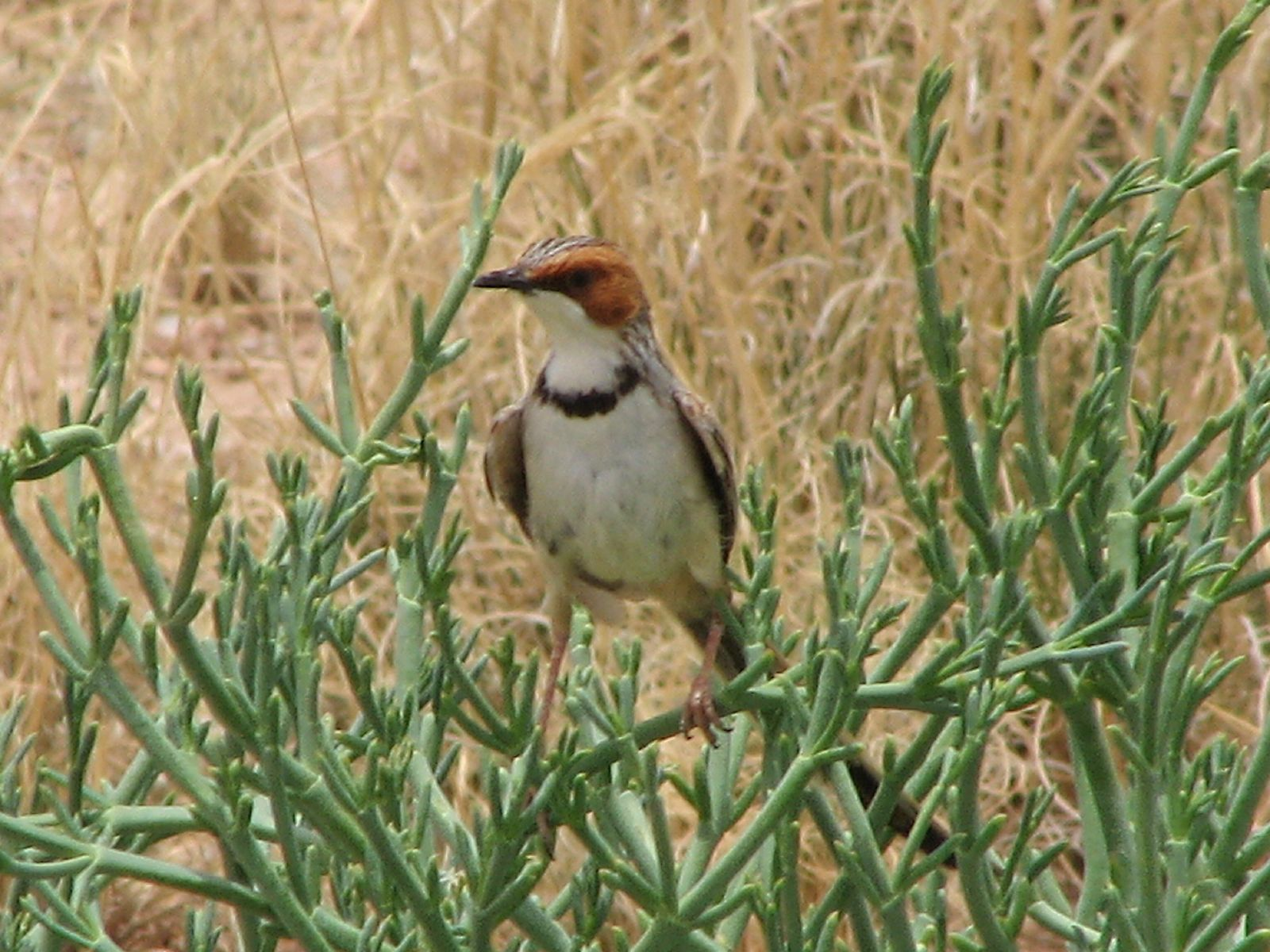
Rufous-eared warbler, Malcorus pectoralis

- Micromacronus (2 species)
- Urolais – monotypic, green longtail (Urolais epichlora)
- Oreolais, (2 species) – moved here from Apalis
- Drymocichla – monotypic, red-winged grey warbler (Drymocichla incana)
- Spiloptila – monotypic, cricket warbler (Spiloptila clamans)
- Phyllolais – monotypic, buff-bellied warbler (Phyllolais pulchella)
- Apalis, apalises (26 species)
- Malcorus – monotypic, rufous-eared warbler (Malcorus pectoralis)
- Hypergerus – monotypic, oriole warbler (Hypergerus atriceps)
- Eminia – monotypic, grey-capped warbler (Eminia lepida)
- Camaroptera (5 species)
- Calamonastes (4 species)
- Euryptila – monotypic, cinnamon-breasted warbler (Euryptila subcinnamomea)
- Bathmocercus, rufous warblers (2 species)
- Scepomycter – monotypic, Winifred's warbler (Scepomycter winifredae) - sometimes merged into Bathmocercus
- Orthotomus, tailorbirds (13 species)
- Artisornis (2 species)
- Poliolais – monotypic, white-tailed warbler (Poliolais lopezi)
- Eremomela (10 species)
