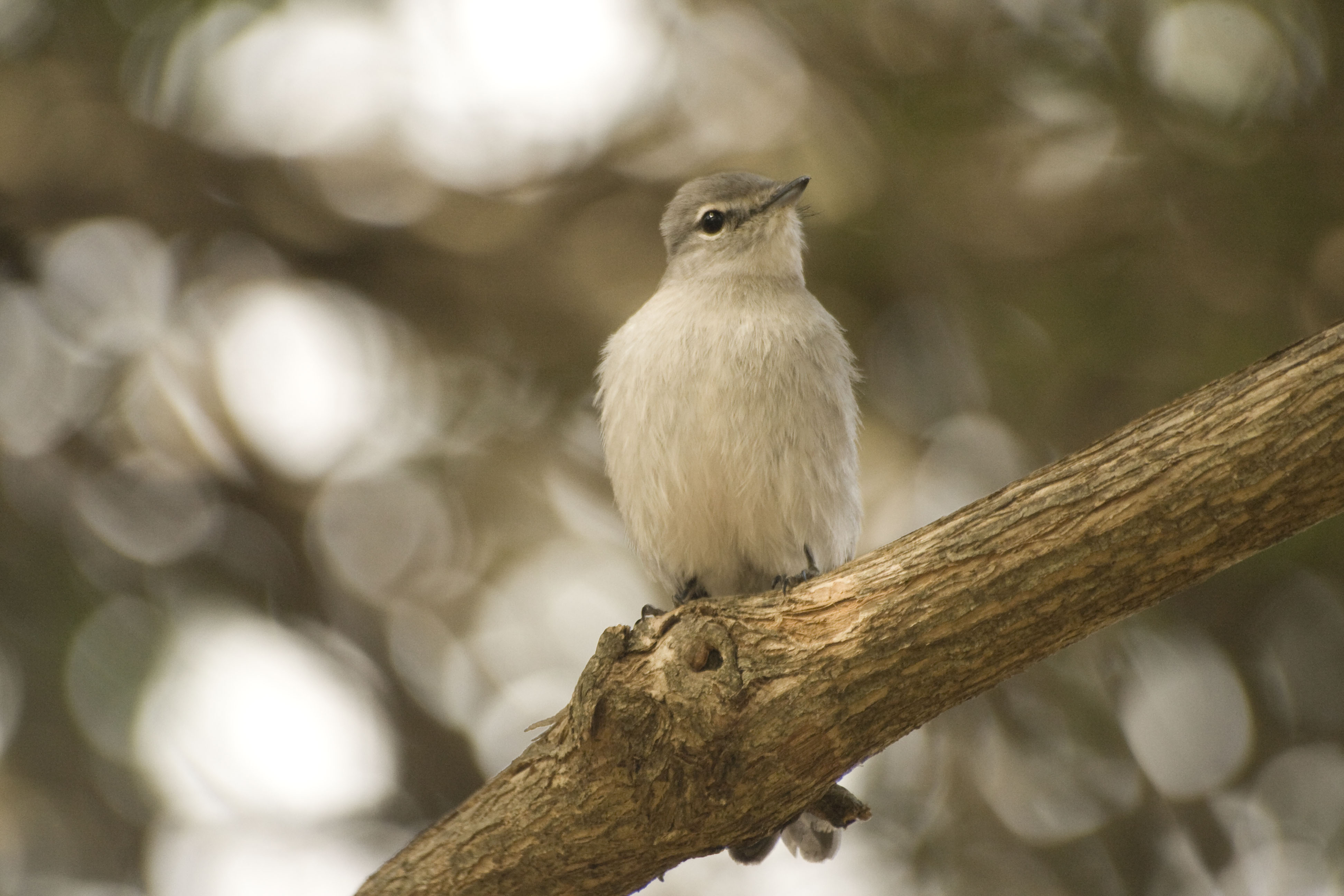

Conservation status
- Least Concern (IUCN 3.1)

Scientific classification
- Kingdom: Animalia
- Phylum: Chordata
- Class: Aves
- Order: Passeriformes
- Family: Muscicapidae
- Genus: Fraseria
- Species: F. caerulescens

Binomial name
- Fraseria caerulescens (Hartlaub, 1865)

Synonyms
- Fraseria caerulescens (Hartlaub, 1865); Muscicapa caerulescens Hartlaub, 1865; Muscicapa cinereola Hartlaub & Finsch, 1870; Eopsaltria cinerea Cassin, 1857; Muscicapa cinerea (Cassin, 1857); Alseonax cinereus (Cassin, 1857); Alseonax ituriensis Reichenow, 1908

= Ashy flycatcher =

Species of bird from Africa

The ashy flycatcher (Fraseria caerulescens) is a species of bird in the Old World flycatcher family Muscicapidae. It is found throughout sub-Saharan Africa, excluding the drier areas of South Africa, Botswana, and Namibia, where it inhabits subtropical or tropical dry forest, subtropical or tropical moist lowland forest, and savanna. It has a disputed generic placement, with different authorities variously putting it in Muscicapa, Fraseria, or other genera. Ashy flycatchers are mostly grey in colour, with pale grey or white underparts, and display no sexual dimorphism.

The species has a small, thin, and pointed beak adapted for eating insects. Its diet is mostly insectivorous, although it also eats berries and small geckoes. The birds are very active, foraging alone, in groups, or in mixed-species flocks. They forage in the upper levels of the canopy, catching prey in flight and from foliage, bark, and leaves. The species breeds in solitary pairs, with each pair maintaining a territory of 1–4 hectares and raising young alone. A variety of vocalisations are used by the species, and there is very little geographical variation in calls.

== Taxonomy and systematics ==
The ashy flycatcher was originally described as Butalis caerulescens by the German ornithologist Gustav Hartlaub in 1865, based on specimens from South Africa. The name of the genus, Fraseria, is in honour of the English zoologist Louis Fraser. The specific name of the species refers to its colour, meaning dark blue or cerulean in Latin. Ashy flycatcher is the official common name designated by the International Ornithologists' Union (IOU). Other common names for the species include ashy alseonax, blue-grey flycatcher, blue-grey alseonax, little blue flycatcher, and white-eyed flycatcher.

The ashy flycatcher was long placed in the genus Muscicapa, but a 2016 study of DNA sequences of Muscicapa flycatchers by Gary Voelker and colleagues found that the genus was paraphyletic. The same study found that the ashy flycatcher was most likely sister to Tessmann's flycatcher, and that these two species were most closely related to the olivaceous flycatcher. As of 2022, the ashy flycatcher's current generic placement is disputed. The IOU and The Clements Checklist place it in Fraseria, along with Tessmann's flycatcher, while the IUCN continues to place it in Muscicapa. The authors of the 2016 study suggested placing these two species in either Cichlomyia or Butalis, depending on which one has priority. A more recent molecular phylogenetic study published in 2023 supports the placement of the species in Fraseria.

=== Subspecies ===
There are six recognised subspecies:

- F. c. caerulescens (Hartlaub, 1865): The nominate subspecies, it is found in Mozambique, South Africa and Eswatini.
- F. c. brevicauda (Ogilvie-Grant, 1907): Found from northern Benin and southern Nigeria to South Sudan, western Kenya, southern Democratic Republic of the Congo (DRC) and northwestern Angola. It is generally darker than the nominate and has slate-grey upperparts with grey underparts.
- F. c. nigrorum (Collin & Hartert, 1927): Found from Guinea to Togo. It is slightly paler than brevicauda, with mouse-grey upperparts and more uniformly grey underparts.
- F. c. cinereola (Hartlaub & Finsch, 1870): Found in Somalia, Kenya and Tanzania. It is intermediate in appearance between brevicauda and impavida.
- F. c. vulturna (Clancey, 1957): Found from Malawi and Mozambique to northern South Africa and Eswatini. It is paler than the nominate, with the throat and belly being purer white.
- F. c. impavida (Clancey, 1957): Found from Angola east to the DRC, Tanzania, and Mozambique and south to Namibia, Botswana, and Zimbabwe. It is even paler than vulturna, with the upperparts being ashier and less blue in color and the underparts being more uniformly white.

== Description ==
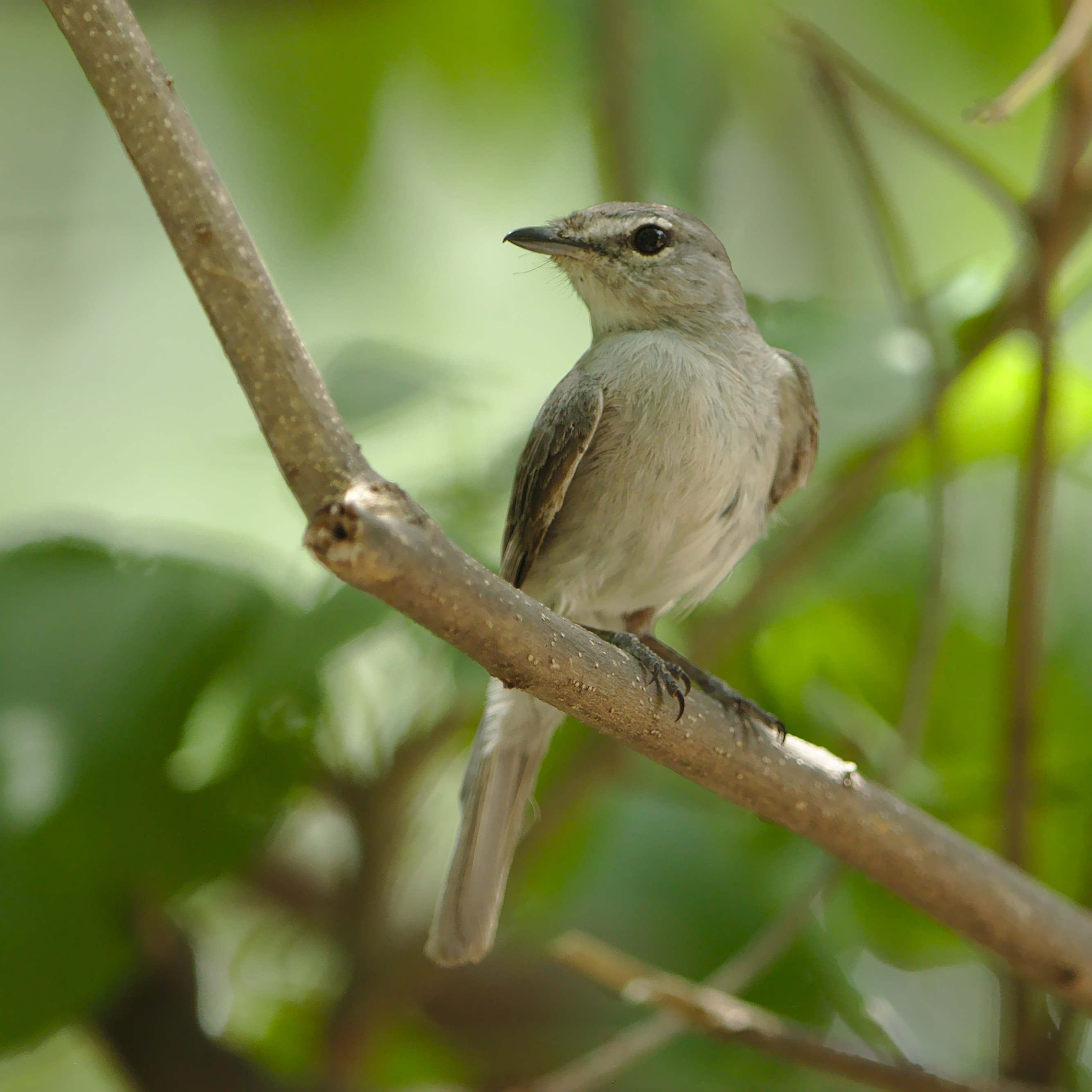
Ashy flycatcher in South Africa

The ashy flycatcher is 13–15 cm (5.1–5.9 in) long. Adults of the nominate subspecies have bluish-grey crowns and upperparts, with very pale grey chins and throats, pale grey breasts and flanks, white bellies and undertail coverts, and grey thighs. They have black loral lines with white stripes above, along with pale, well-defined eye-rings. The flight feathers and tail are brownish-black and the upperwing coverts are brownish-black with grey fringes. The axillaries and underwing coverts are white. The bill is generally blackish, although the base of the lower half is pinkish-grey. The iris is dark brown, and the legs are dark grey or black. Both sexes look similar. Juveniles are brownish, extensively marked with buff on the upperparts, buff tips to the upperwing coverts, and spotted underparts. Immatures are more similar to adults, but have buff tips to the wing feathers.

The species may be confused with several other flycatchers that share its range. The grey tit-flycatcher can be distinguished from the present species by a combination of its white-edged dark tail and foraging behaviour; the grey tit-flycatcher gleans insects from leaves, compared to the ashy flycatcher's more active method of sallying for insects. The African dusky flycatcher can be told apart by its larger head and more rounded, dumpy, and, according to some observers, "cuter" appearance.

In the east-central portion of its range, the ashy flycatcher may also be confused with the white-eyed slaty flycatcher; the latter species is usually larger, with a longer tail and a differently coloured bill, blue at the base and black at the tip. The white-eyed slaty flycatcher also has a more prominent white eye-ring, although the extent of the ring varies between individuals and may not be diagnostic. The dusky-blue flycatcher, which co-occurs with the ashy flycatcher, is generally darker in colour, with an especially dark breast, no eye-ring, and a thicker white line above the eyes.

=== Vocalisations ===
The ashy flycatcher is a widespread species, but very little variation in vocalisations has been observed through its range. It has a varied repertoire of call types and many different calls. The dawn song consists of 5–7 notes that typically start at a high pitch before going down and then up again. Phrases typically repeat every 3–5 phrases. It is given at dawn in complete darkness for at least 30 minutes from a high canopy level on a fixed perch. After sunrise, birds switch from the dawn song to the day song, which consists of 3–8 short staccato notes. Other songs include the warbling song.

The ashy flycatcher's calls include short peeps and chirps, a high-pitched wheeze, and other notes. A piercing, slightly descending hiss is used as an alarm, often uttered to warn of approaching predators. It is very similar to the alarm calls of other species of birds and is an interspecific call. A distress call, consisting of a shrill, high-pitched, and buzzing note, is given when birds are in panic or stressed. Males also snap wings and bill when observers approach their offspring. Chicks give a high-pitched begging call, which has also been described as a "shrill, short, rattling squeak".

== Behaviour and ecology ==
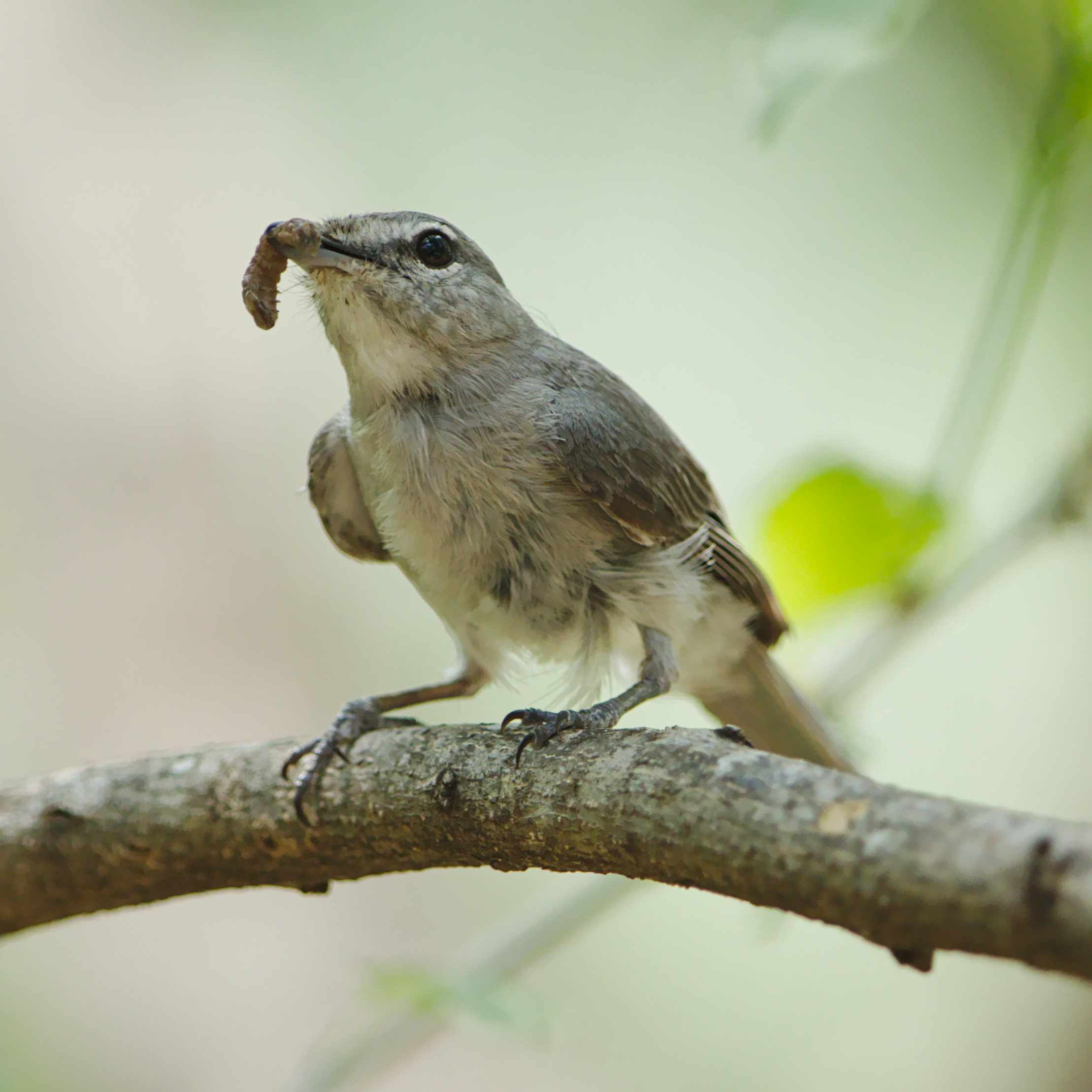
An ashy flycatcher feeding on larva at Mapungubwe National Park in Limpopo, South Africa.

It is a restless and active bird that is constantly moving and shifting. It has been observed sunbathing on the ground.

=== Diet ===
The ashy flycatcher forages singly, in pairs, or in groups of up to seven individuals. It is also known to sometimes join mixed-species flocks while foraging. Foraging is typically done in the upper levels of vegetation, between the treetops and the undercanopy. Ashy flycatchers typically sit upright on exposed perches. Food is caught by making short circular flights to catch flying insects or hovering to catch prey in foliage. It also gleans insects from foliage and bark.

Its diet consists of mostly insects, mainly beetles, flies, grasshoppers, adult and larval moths and butterflies, winged ants, and termites. Prey tend to be 5–35 mm (0.20–1.38 in) in size, with the majority being 15–20 mm (0.59–0.79 in) in size. They have also been observed eating small fruit and berries, and rarely, geckos up to 5 cm (2.0 in) in length.

=== Breeding ===
The ashy flycatcher mainly breeds from September–January, with the exact observed breeding period varying throughout its range; it has also been observed breeding from February–June in the DRC, and in February, May, June, and August in East Africa. Pairs are monogamous, solitary, and territorial, maintaining areas of up to 20 hectare in the non-breeding seasons and territories of 1–4 ha during the breeding season. Nests are generally built at heights of 2–15 m (7–49 ft) in crevices, cavities, or forks in trees, or sometimes in holes or ledges in walls. They are built by both sexes and consist of a sturdy "cup" made of moss, grass, rootlets, shredded bark, fibers, and spiderwebs. Nests have an outer diameter of 11–18 cm (4.3–7.1 in), with an inner diameter of 45–50 mm (1.8–2.0 in) and a depth of 25–28 mm (0.98–1.10 in). Birds have been recorded building over old nests and inhabiting old weaver bird nests. Eggs are 19 mm × 14.5 mm (0.75 in × 0.57 in) in size and glossy whitish-buff in appearance, with yellowish-brown or reddish flecking; they are laid in clutches of 2–3 and take 14 days to incubate. After hatching, young are fed by both parents.

== Distribution and habitat ==
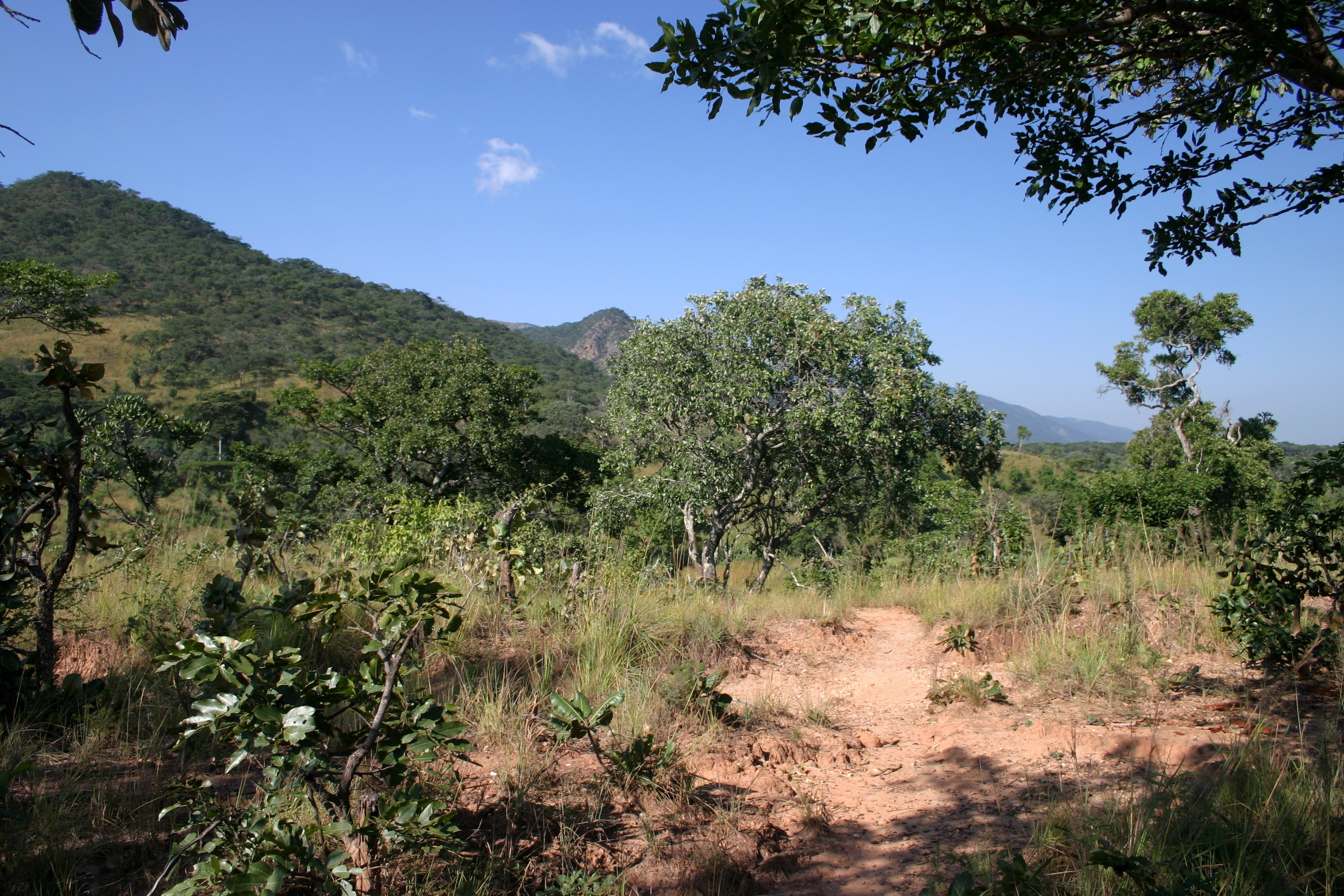
Miombo woodland in Malawi; ashy flycatchers are known to inhabit miombo, as well other forest types.

The ashy flycatcher is found through most of sub-Saharan Africa, from southern Cameroon east through Uganda to southern Kenya and Somalia, and south to Angola, northern Namibia and Botswana, and eastern South Africa. It is absent from the arid regions of Namibia, Botswana, and South Africa, but is found patchily through West Africa, in Sierra Leone, southeastern Guinea, Liberia, Côte d'Ivoire, southern Ghana, southwestern Togo, extreme southern Benin, Burkina Faso, and southern Nigeria. It is mainly resident, but shows limited migration in the southern portions of its range. In South Africa, it has been observed migrating altitudinally in the Great Escarpment and in KwaZulu-Natal. It is also thought to be a non-breeding migrant in Mozambique and the Lebombo Mountains and southern Lowveld of Eswatini.

The species inhabits a variety of forest and woodland. It occurs near forest edges and enters forest only if it has been logged or opened by roads. It is also known to inhabit open gallery forest, secondary growth, riverine strips, and some plantations. It occurs in peanut and cassava fields with scattered tall trees and borders of shrubs or bushes, along with miombo woodland, dense woodland thickets, open riverine woodland, and thornveld and thorn-scrub. It mainly inhabits altitudes of up to 1,500 m (4,900 ft), although it is known to occur at altitudes of up to 1,800 m (5,900 ft) in eastern Africa.

== Status ==
The ashy flycatcher was listed as being of least concern by the International Union for Conservation of Nature (IUCN) on the IUCN Red List due to its large range, stable population, and occurrence in a number of protected areas. The population in Mozambique is estimated to number over 5,000 individuals.
