= Itombwe =

Itombwe may refer to:

- Itombwe Mountains, also known as the Itombwe Plateau, a plateau in South Kivu, Democratic Republic of the Congo, overlooking the Ruzizi plain
- Itombwe Nature Reserve, a nature reserve on the Itombwe Mountains
- Itombwe flycatcher, a bird also known as Chapin's flycatcher, a different species
- Itombwe Massif clawed frog, also known as Xenopus itombwensis
- Itombwe nightjar, a bird also known as Prigogine's nightjar
