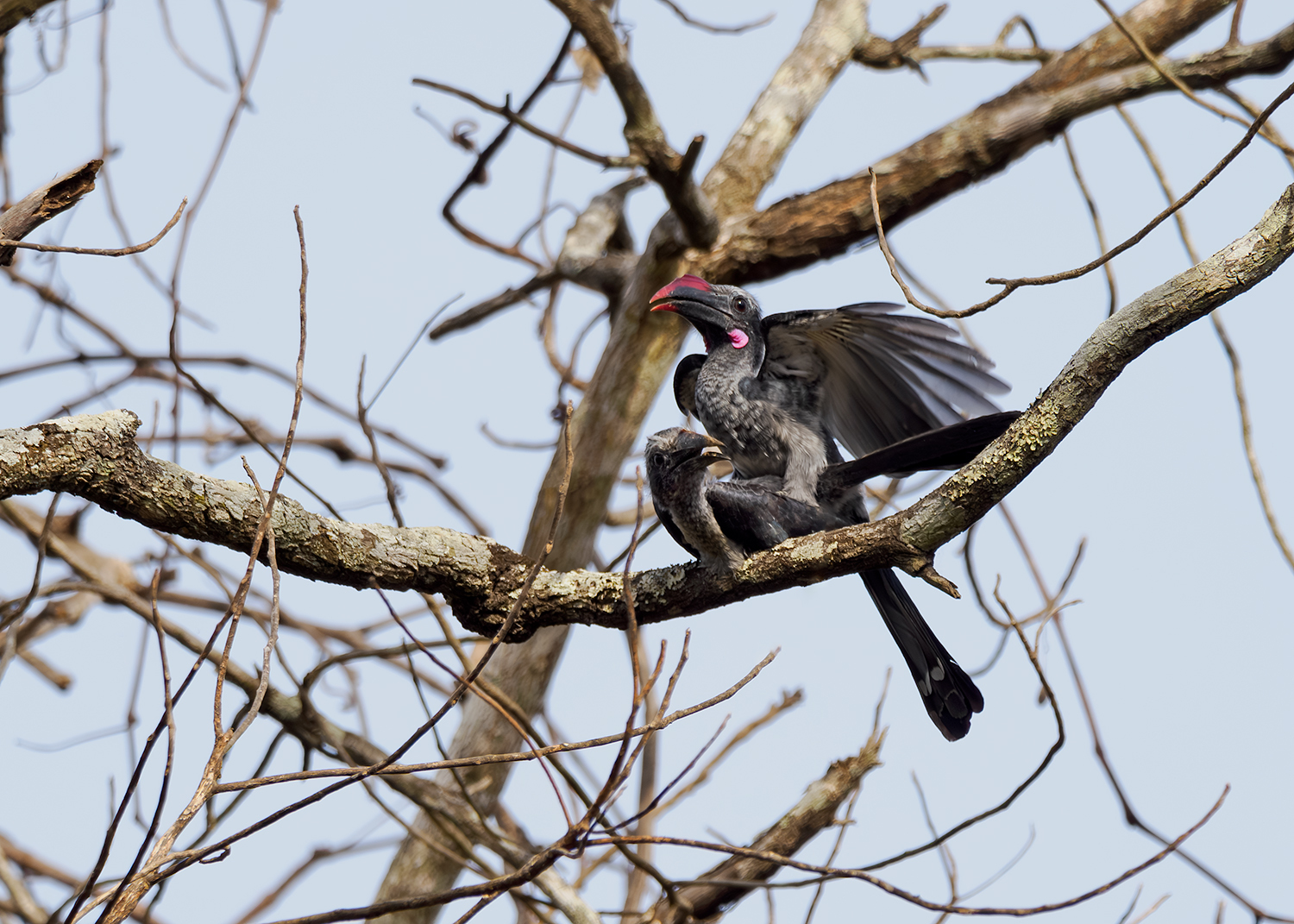

Conservation status
- Least Concern (IUCN 3.1)

Scientific classification
- Kingdom: Animalia
- Phylum: Chordata
- Class: Aves
- Order: Bucerotiformes
- Family: Bucerotidae
- Genus: Horizocerus
- Species: H. granti

Binomial name
- Horizocerus granti (Hartert, 1895)

Synonyms
- Lophoceros granti (protonym)

= Eastern dwarf hornbill =

Species of bird

The eastern dwarf hornbill (Horizocerus granti) is a species of hornbill in the family Bucerotidae. It is native to the Congo Basin. It was formerly considered to be a subspecies of the western dwarf hornbill (Horizocerus hartlaubi), with the English name "black dwarf hornbill".

== Taxonomy ==
The eastern dwarf hornbill was formally described in 1895 by the German ornithologist Ernst Hartert based on a specimen collected near the Aruwimi River, a tributary of the Congo River, during the Emin Pasha Relief Expedition led by Henry Morton Stanley. Hartert coined the binomial name Lophoceros granti. The specific epithet was chosen to honour the Scottish ornithologist William Ogilvie-Grant. This species is placed in the genus Horizocerus that was introduced in 1899 by the American ornithologist Harry C. Oberholser.
