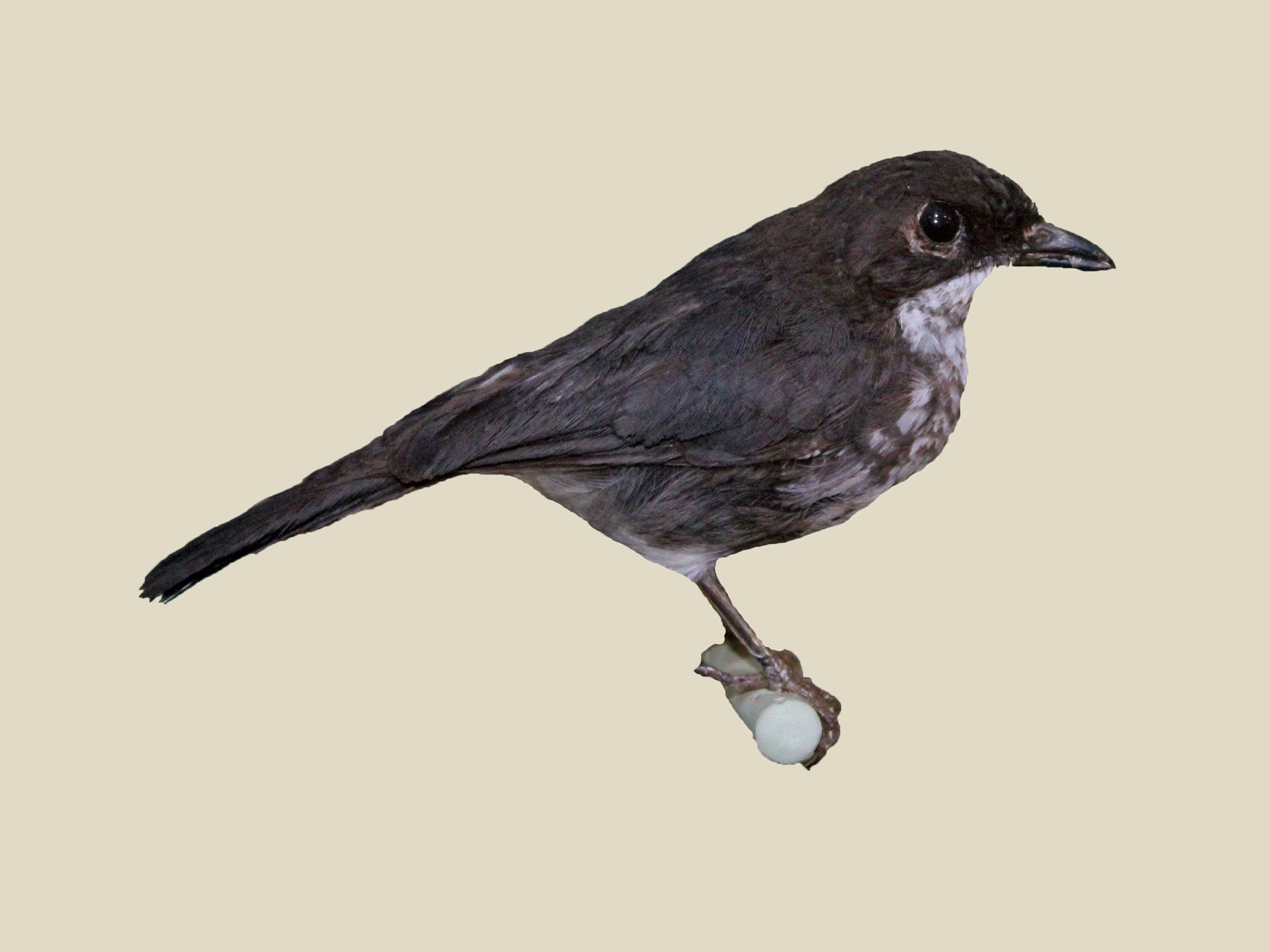
- Fraseria ocreata

Scientific classification
- Kingdom: Animalia
- Phylum: Chordata
- Class: Aves
- Order: Passeriformes
- Family: Muscicapidae
- Genus: Fraseria; Bonaparte, 1854

Type species
- Tephrodornis ocreatus Strickland, 1844

= Fraseria =

Genus of birds

Fraseria is a genus of passerine birds in the Old World flycatcher family Muscicapidae that are found in Sub-Saharan Africa.

== Taxonomy ==
The genus Fraseria was introduced in 1854 by the French naturalist Charles Lucien Bonaparte to accommodate Fraser's forest flycatcher. The genus name was chosen to honour the English natural history dealer and collector Louis Fraser.

The genus formerly include just two species, Fraser's forest flycatcher and the white-browed forest flycatcher, but based on a molecular phylogenetic study published in 2023, the genus was broadened to include other species.

The genus contains the following eight species:

| Image | Common name | Scientific name | Distribution |
|---|---|---|---|
| | White-browed forest flycatcher | Fraseria cinerascens | African tropical rainforest |
| | Fraser's forest flycatcher | Fraseria ocreata | African tropical rainforest |
| | Grey-throated tit flycatcher | Fraseria griseigularis | African tropical rainforest |
| | Grey tit-flycatcher | Fraseria plumbea | Sub-Saharan Africa (rare in southern and East Africa) |
| | Olivaceous flycatcher | Fraseria olivascens | African tropical rainforest |
| | Chapin's flycatcher | Fraseria lendu | Albertine Rift montane forests |
| | Ashy flycatcher | Fraseria caerulescens | Sub-Saharan Africa (rare in southern Africa) |
| | Tessmann's flycatcher | Fraseria tessmanni | sparsely present throughout African tropical rainforest |
