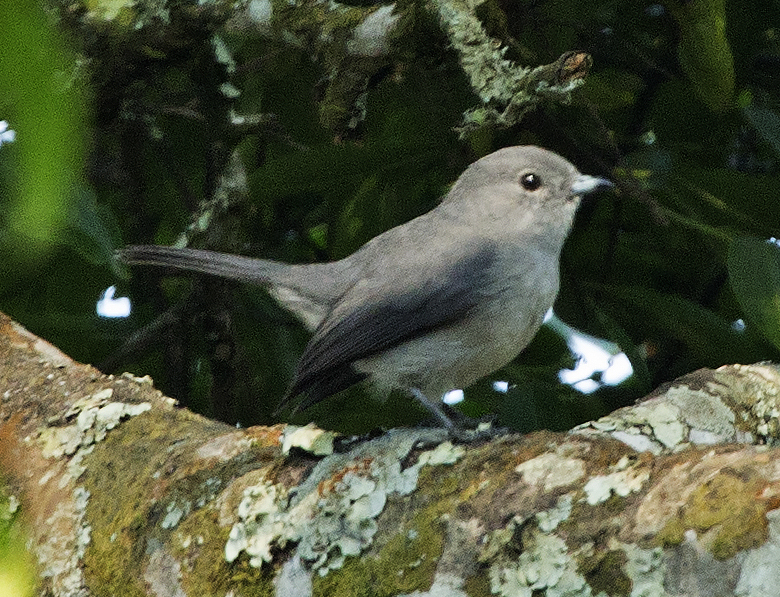

Conservation status
- Least Concern (IUCN 3.1)

Scientific classification
- Kingdom: Animalia
- Phylum: Chordata
- Class: Aves
- Order: Passeriformes
- Family: Muscicapidae
- Genus: Fraseria
- Species: F. griseigularis

Binomial name
- Fraseria griseigularis (Jackson, 1906)

Synonyms
- Myioparus griseigularis

= Grey-throated tit-flycatcher =

Species of bird

The grey-throated tit-flycatcher (Fraseria griseigularis) is a species of bird in the family Muscicapidae. It is widespread across the African tropical rainforest.
