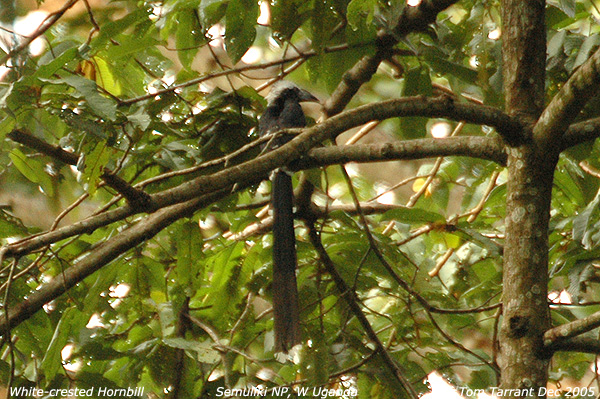

Conservation status
- Least Concern (IUCN 3.1)

Scientific classification
- Kingdom: Animalia
- Phylum: Chordata
- Class: Aves
- Order: Bucerotiformes
- Family: Bucerotidae
- Genus: Horizocerus
- Species: H. cassini

Binomial name
- Horizocerus cassini (Finsch, 1903)

Synonyms
- Ortholophus cassini Finsch, 1903; Horizocerus albocristatus cassini (Finsch, 1903)

= Eastern long-tailed hornbill =

Species of bird

The eastern long-tailed hornbill (Horizocerus cassini) is a species of bird in the hornbill family Bucerotidae found in humid forests of West Africa. It was formerly considered to be conspecific with the western long-tailed hornbill (Horizocerus albocristatus) with the English name "white-crested hornbill".

== Taxonomy ==
The eastern long-tailed hornbill was formally described in 1903 by the German naturalist Otto Finsch based on a specimen from Gabon in West Africa. He coined the binomial name Ortholophus cassini. The specific epithet was chosen to honour the American ornithologist John Cassin. The species is now placed in the genus Horizocerus that was introduced in 1899 by the American ornithologist Harry C. Oberholser. The eastern long-tailed hornbill was formerly considered to be conspecific with the western long-tailed hornbill (Horizocerus albocristatus) with the English name "white-crested hornbill".
