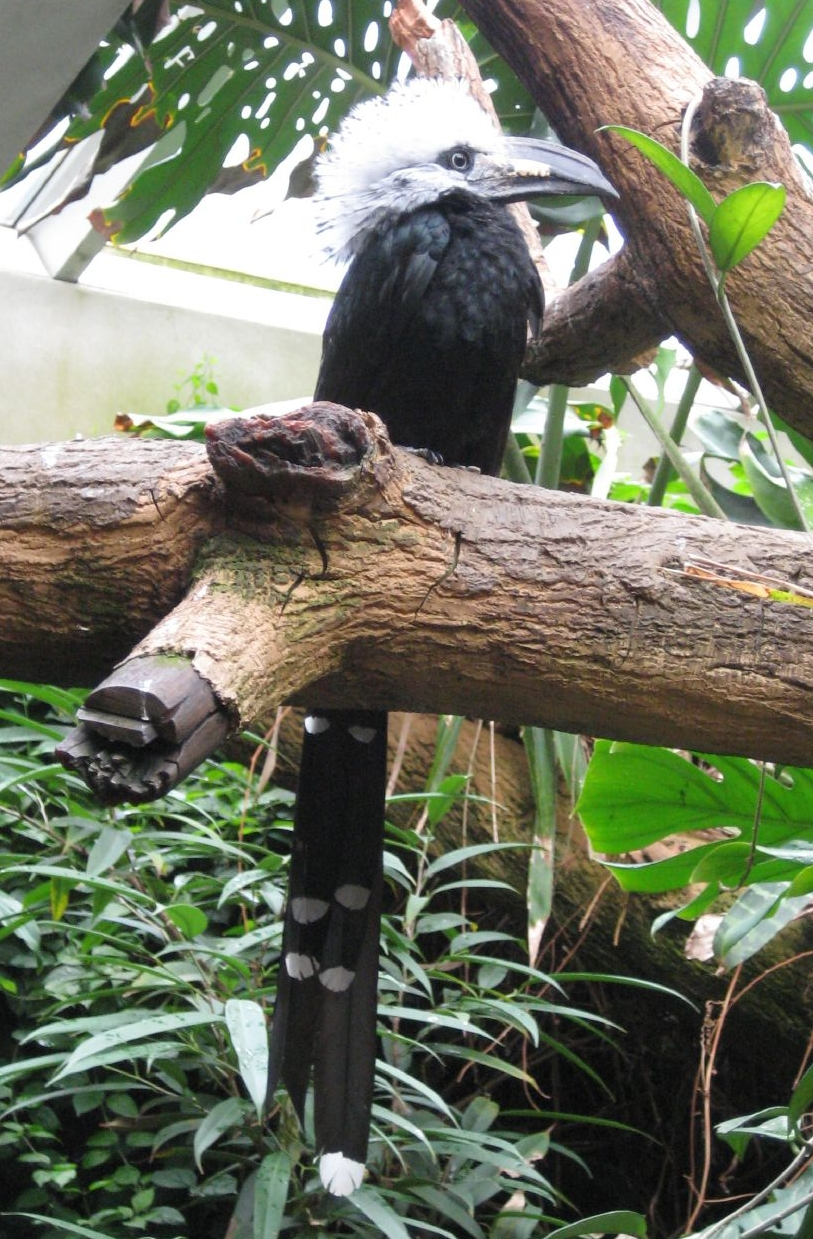
- White-crested hornbill, Horizocerus albocristatus

Scientific classification
- Kingdom: Animalia
- Phylum: Chordata
- Class: Aves
- Order: Bucerotiformes
- Family: Bucerotidae
- Genus: Horizocerus; Oberholser, 1899

Species
- See text.

= Horizocerus =

Genus of birds

Horizocerus is a genus of birds in the hornbill family, Bucerotidae, that are native to West Africa.

== Species ==
The genus contains the following four species:

Image	Scientific name	Common name	Distribution
	Horizocerus hartlaubi	Western dwarf hornbill	south Guinea and south Sierra Leone to Gabon and the Congo Basin west of the Congo River
	Horizocerus granti	Eastern dwarf hornbill	Democratic Republic of the Congo and east central Congo to west Uganda
	Horizocerus albocristatus	Western long-tailed hornbill	Guinea to Benin in West Africa
	Horizocerus cassini	Eastern long-tailed hornbill	Nigeria to north Angola and west Uganda
