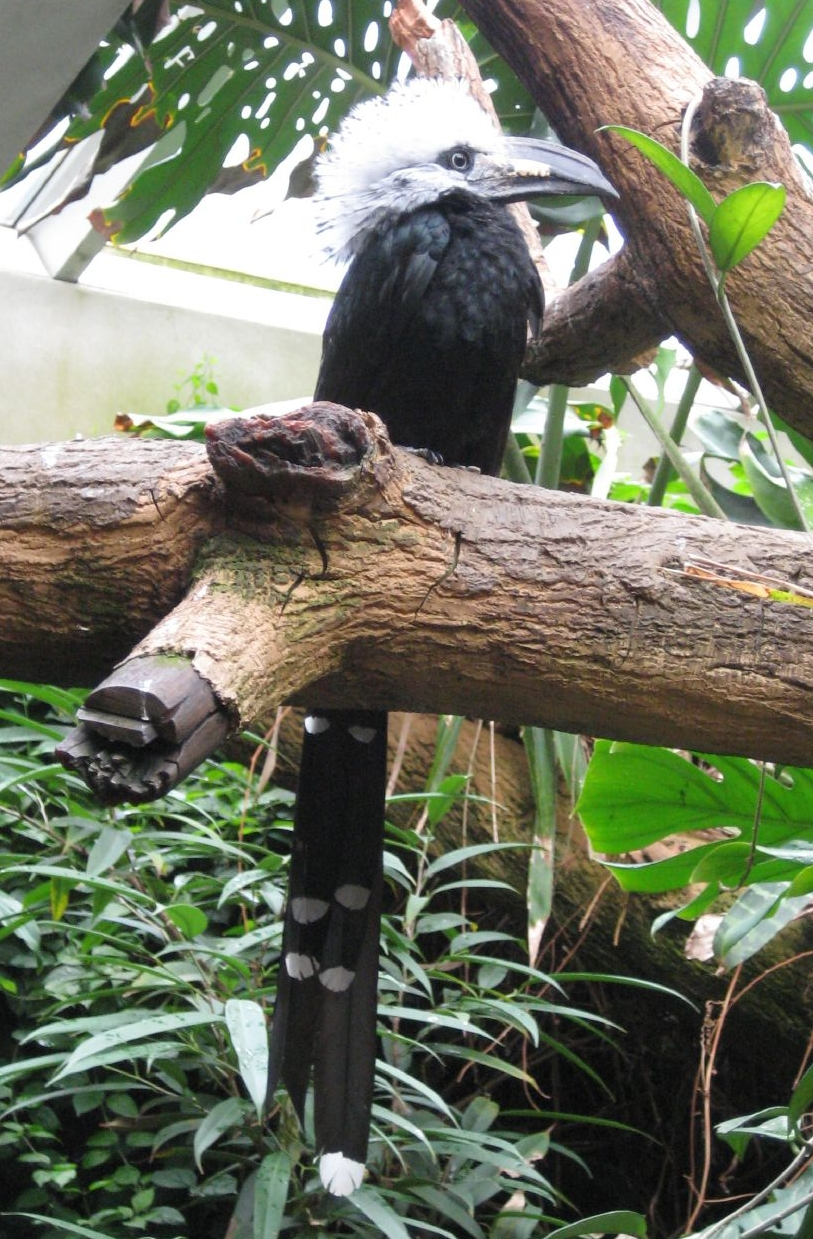
- T. a. albocristatus at Central Park Zoo, USA

Conservation status
- Least Concern (IUCN 3.1)

Scientific classification
- Kingdom: Animalia
- Phylum: Chordata
- Class: Aves
- Order: Bucerotiformes
- Family: Bucerotidae
- Genus: Horizocerus
- Species: H. albocristatus

Binomial name
- Horizocerus albocristatus (Cassin, 1848)

Synonyms
- Buceros albocristatus (protonym) Tockus albocristatus Berenicornis albocristatus Tropicranus albocristatus

= Western long-tailed hornbill =

Species of bird

The western long-tailed hornbill (Horizocerus albocristatus) is a species of hornbill (family Bucerotidae) found in humid forests of West Africa. It was formerly considered to be conspecific with the eastern long-tailed hornbill (Horizocerus cassini) with the English name "white-crested hornbill".

== Taxonomy ==
The western long-tailed hornbill was formally described in 1848 by the American ornithologist John Cassin based on a specimen that had been collected near the Saint Paul River in Liberia. He coined the binomial name Buceros albocristatus. The specific epithet combines the Latin albus meaning "white" with cristatus meaning "crested" or "plumed". The species is now placed in the genus Horizocerus that was introduced in 1899 by the American ornithologist Harry C. Oberholser. The western long-tailed hornbill was formerly considered to be conspecific with the eastern long-tailed hornbill (Horizocerus cassini) with the English name "white-crested hornbill".

There are two subspecies, which differ primarily in the amount of white to their head and neck and the presence or absence of white tips to the wing-coverts:

- H. a. albocristatus (Cassin, 1848) – Guinea to west Ivory Coast
- H. a. macrourus (Bonaparte, 1850) – east Ivory Coast to Benin

== Distribution and habitat ==
The western long-tailed hornbill has a large range in West Africa, occurring from southern Sierra Leone, east to Benin including Côte d'Ivoire, Ghana, Guinea, Liberia, and Togo. It is frequent in parts of its range. Although its population is difficult to estimate, it is not thought to be threatened.

== Gallery ==
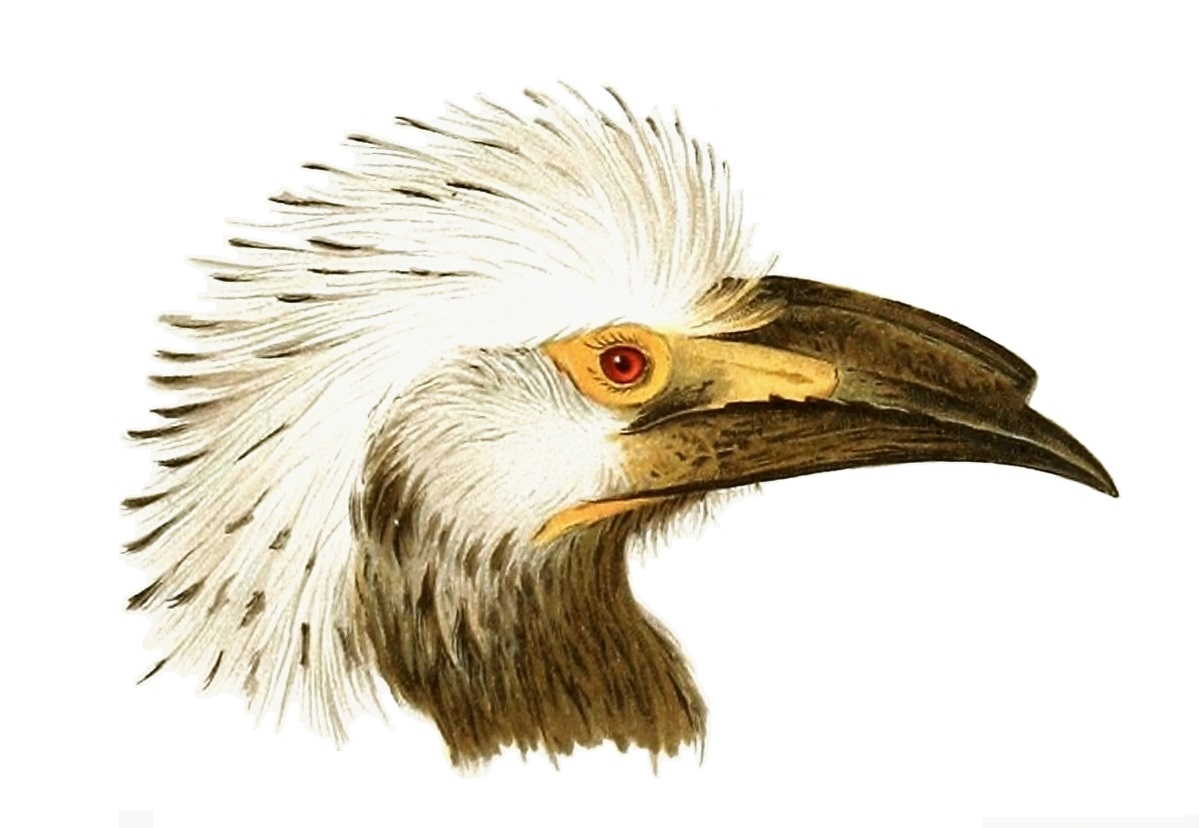
Head of H. a. macrourus

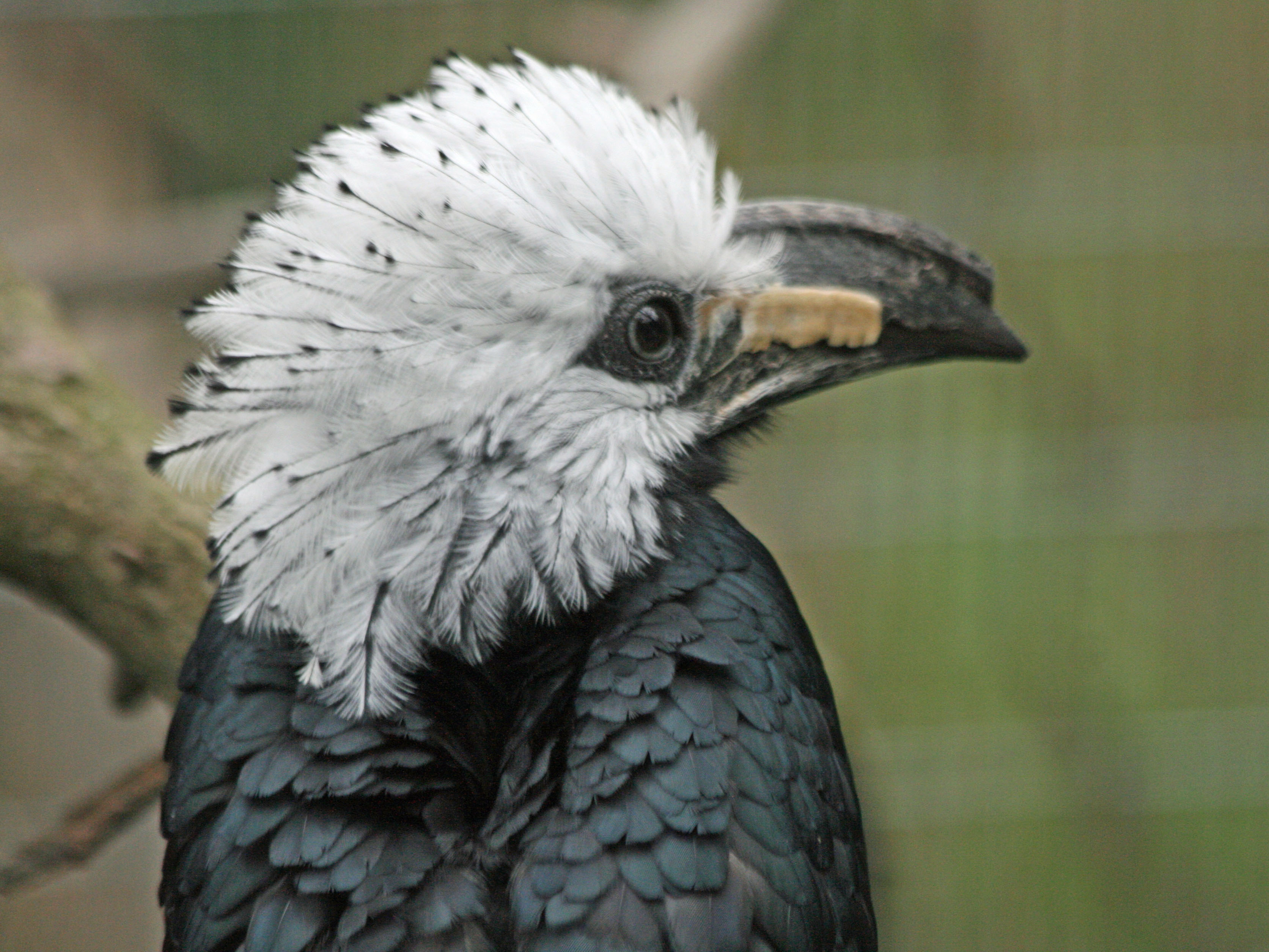
At San Diego Zoo

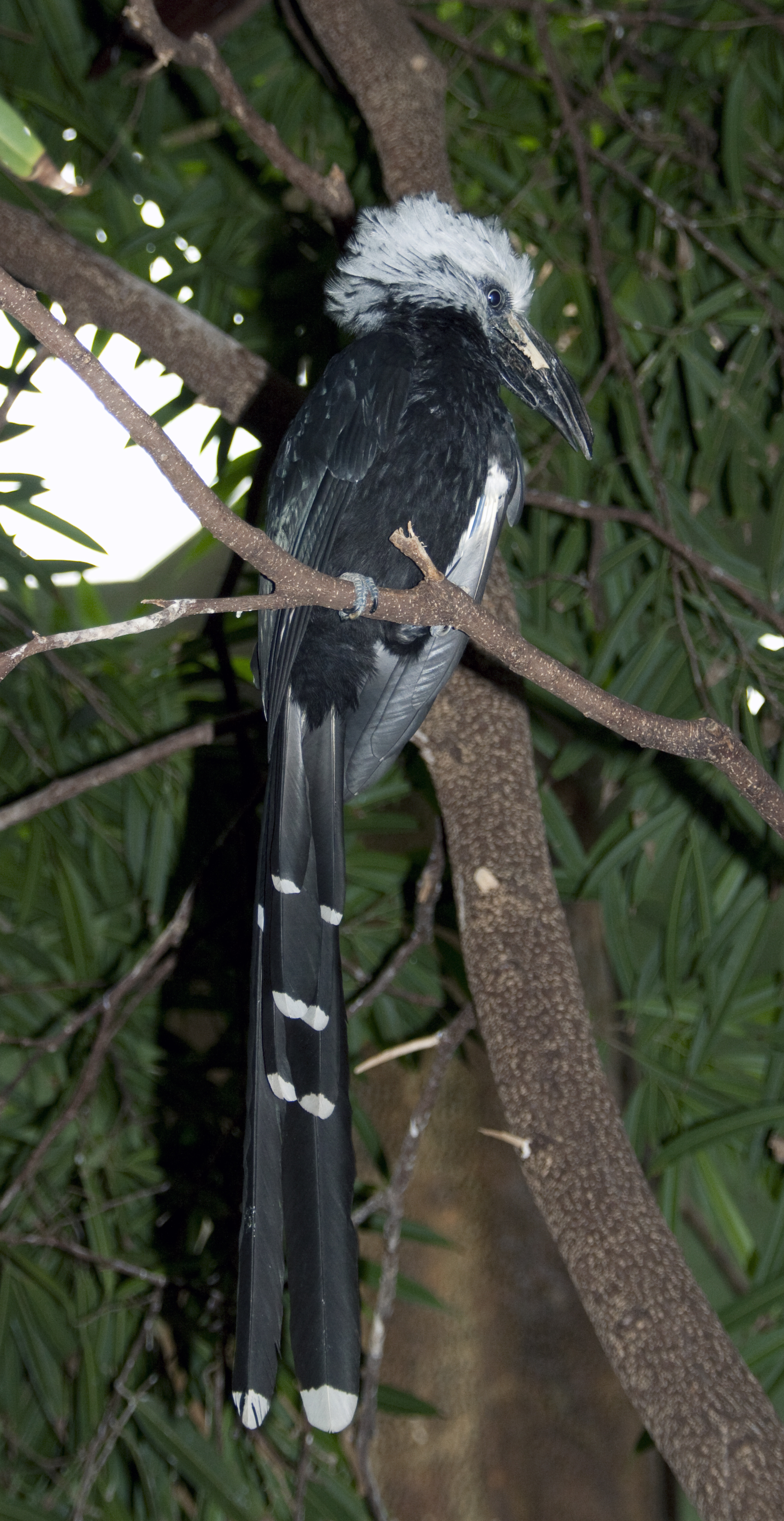
At Central Park Zoo, USA
