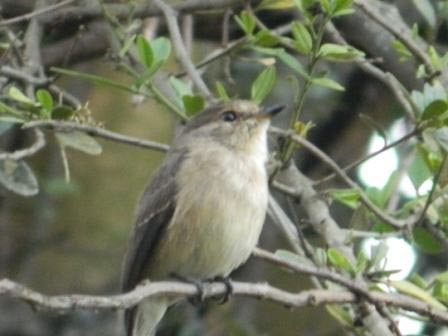

Conservation status
- Vulnerable (IUCN 3.1)

Scientific classification
- Kingdom: Animalia
- Phylum: Chordata
- Class: Aves
- Order: Passeriformes
- Family: Muscicapidae
- Genus: Fraseria
- Species: F. lendu

Binomial name
- Fraseria lendu (Chapin, 1932)

Synonyms
- Muscicapa lendu

= Chapin's flycatcher =

Species of bird

Chapin's flycatcher (Fraseria lendu) is a bird species in the Old World flycatcher family (Muscicapidae). It is native to the Albertine Rift montane forests. The Itombwe flycatcher was formerly considered conspecific.

Its natural habitat is subtropical or tropical moist montane forests. It is threatened by habitat loss.

The common name commemorates the American ornithologist James Paul Chapin.
