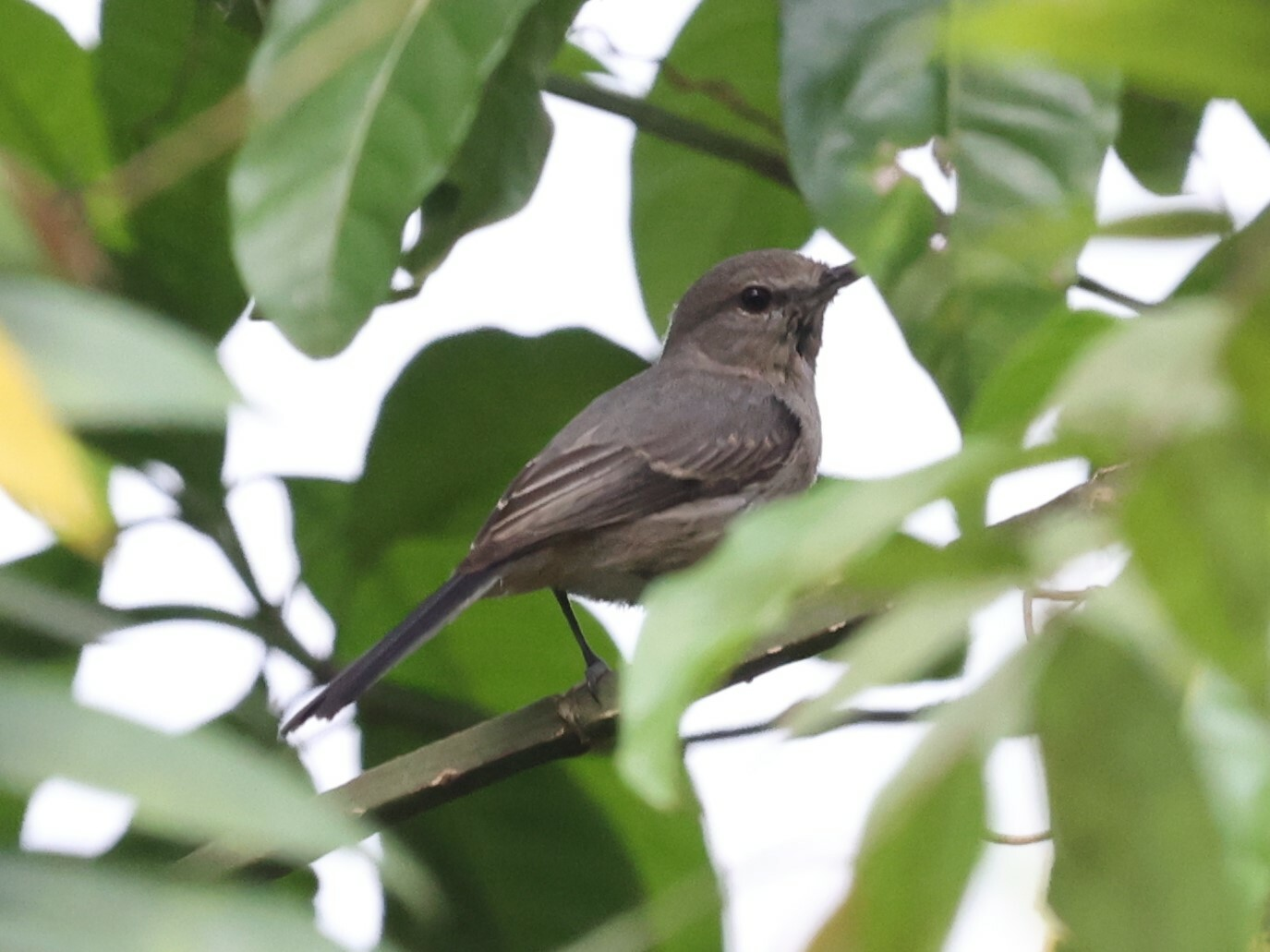

Conservation status
- Least Concern (IUCN 3.1)

Scientific classification
- Kingdom: Animalia
- Phylum: Chordata
- Class: Aves
- Order: Passeriformes
- Family: Muscicapidae
- Genus: Fraseria
- Species: F. plumbea

Binomial name
- Fraseria plumbea (Hartlaub, 1858)

Synonyms
- Myioparus plumbeus

= Grey tit-flycatcher =

Species of bird

The grey tit-flycatcher (Fraseria plumbea) is a species of bird in the family Muscicapidae. It has an extensive but patchy distribution in sub-Saharan Africa.

== Range and habitat ==
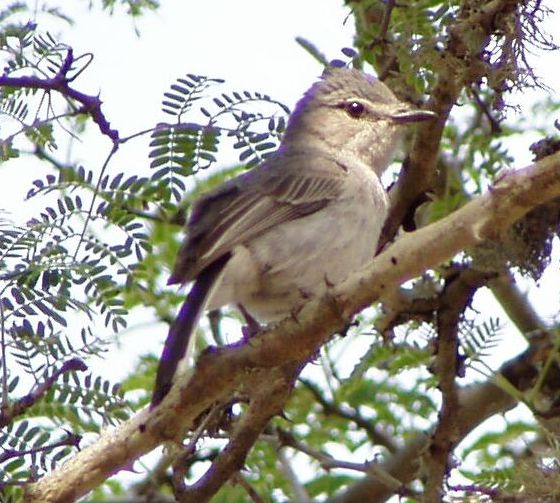
F. p. catoleuca (Mkhuze Game Reserve, South Africa)

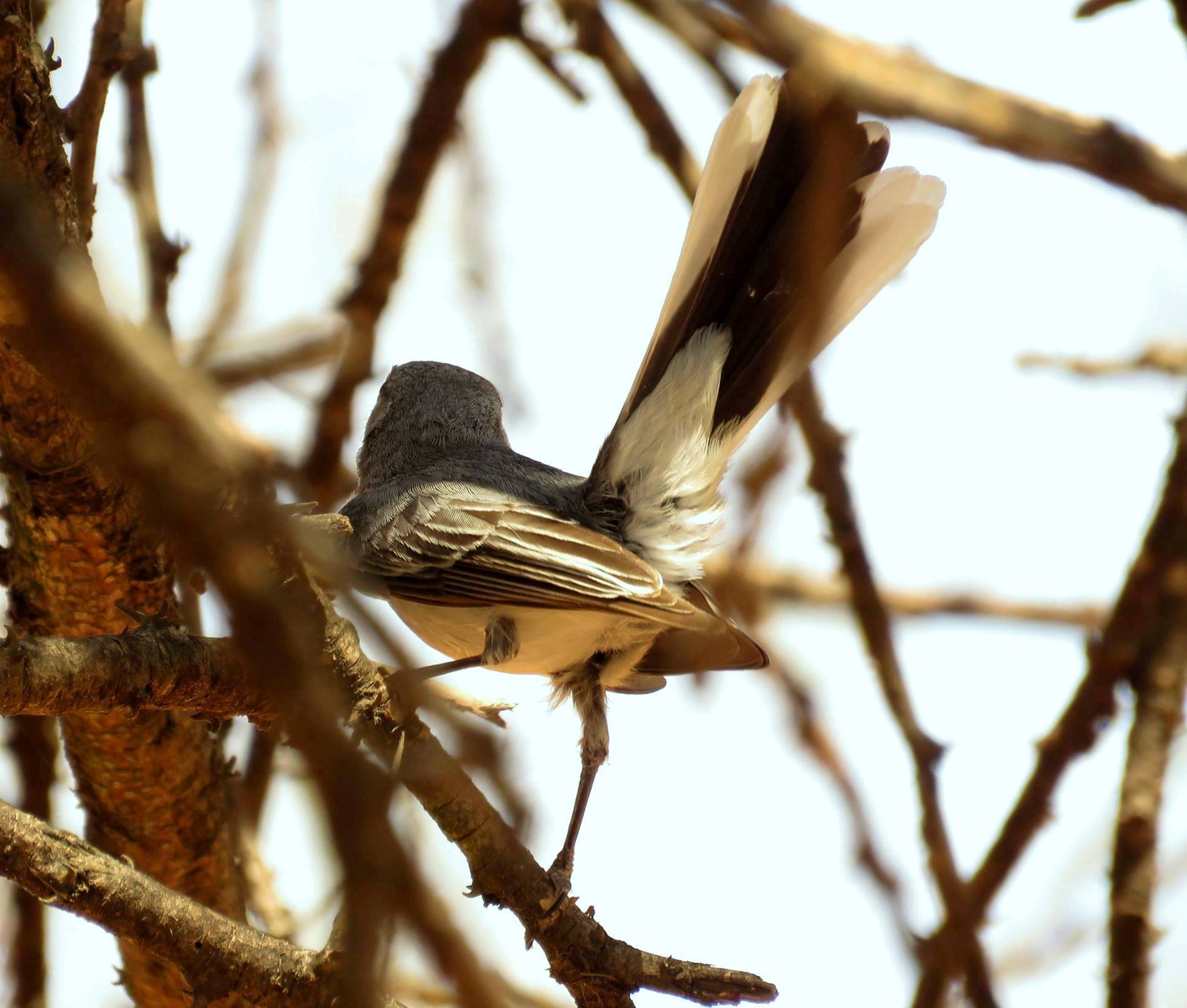
The tail is often flicked and fanned.

It is widespread across Sub-Saharan Africa (rare in southern and the Horn of Africa).

Its natural habitats are subtropical or tropical dry forest and subtropical or tropical moist lowland forest.
