= Olivaceous flycatcher =

Conservation status
- Least Concern (IUCN 3.1)

Scientific classification
- Kingdom: Animalia
- Phylum: Chordata
- Class: Aves
- Order: Passeriformes
- Family: Muscicapidae
- Genus: Fraseria
- Species: F. olivascens

Binomial name
- Fraseria olivascens (Cassin, 1859)

Species of bird

The name "olivaceous flycatcher" can also refer to the dusky-capped flycatcher (Myiarchus tuberculifer) of the Americas.

The olivaceous flycatcher (Fraseria olivascens) or olivaceous alseonax, is a species of bird in the family Muscicapidae. It is sparsely distributed throughout the African tropical rainforest. Its natural habitats are subtropical or tropical moist lowland forest and subtropical or tropical swamps.
