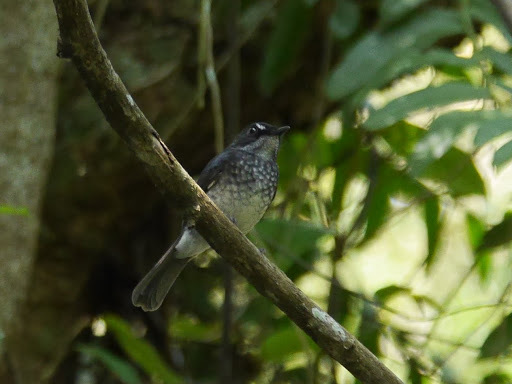
- White-browed forest flycatcher in the Democratic Republic of the Congo

Conservation status
- Least Concern (IUCN 3.1)

Scientific classification
- Kingdom: Animalia
- Phylum: Chordata
- Class: Aves
- Order: Passeriformes
- Family: Muscicapidae
- Genus: Fraseria
- Species: F. cinerascens

Binomial name
- Fraseria cinerascens Hartlaub, 1857

= White-browed forest flycatcher =

Species of bird

The white-browed forest flycatcher (Fraseria cinerascens) is a species of bird in the family Muscicapidae.

It is found throughout the intra-tropical rainforest of Sub-Saharan Africa.

Its natural habitats are subtropical or tropical moist lowland forest and subtropical or tropical swamps.
