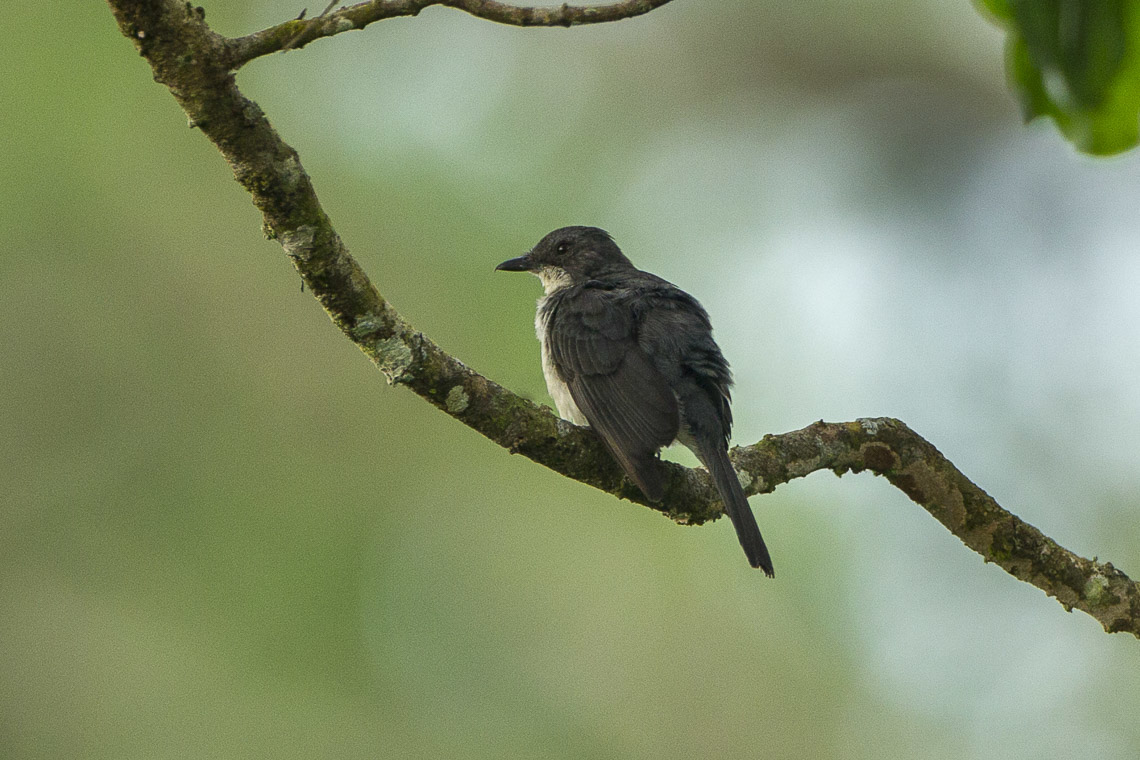

Conservation status
- Least Concern (IUCN 3.1)

Scientific classification
- Kingdom: Animalia
- Phylum: Chordata
- Class: Aves
- Order: Passeriformes
- Family: Muscicapidae
- Genus: Fraseria
- Species: F. ocreata

Binomial name
- Fraseria ocreata (Strickland, 1844)

= Fraser's forest flycatcher =

Species of bird

Fraser's forest flycatcher (Fraseria ocreata), also known as the African forest-flycatcher, is a species of bird in the family Muscicapidae. It is found throughout the intra-tropical rainforest of Sub-Saharan Africa.
