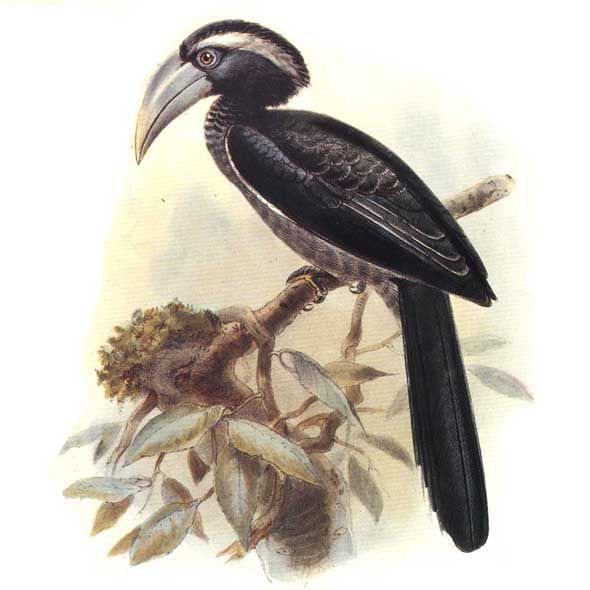

Conservation status
- Least Concern (IUCN 3.1)

Scientific classification
- Kingdom: Animalia
- Phylum: Chordata
- Class: Aves
- Order: Bucerotiformes
- Family: Bucerotidae
- Genus: Horizocerus
- Species: H. hartlaubi

Binomial name
- Horizocerus hartlaubi (Gould, 1861)
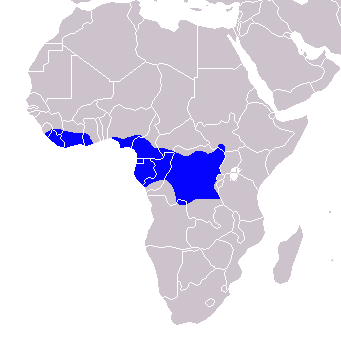

Synonyms
- Tockus hartlaubi

= Western dwarf hornbill =

Species of bird

The western dwarf hornbill (Horizocerus hartlaubi) is a species of hornbill in the family Bucerotidae. It is widely spread across the African tropical rainforest. It was formerly considered to be conspecific with the eastern dwarf hornbill (Horizocerus granti) with the English name "black dwarf hornbill".

== Taxonomy ==
The western dwarf hornbill was formally described in 1861 by the English ornithologist John Gould based on a specimen from "Western Africa". Gould coined the binomial name Toccus hartlaubi. The specific epithet was chosen to honour of the German ornithologist Gustav Hartlaub. This species was previously assigned to the genus Tockus but is now placed in the genus Horizocerus that was introduced in 1899 by the American ornithologist Harry C. Oberholser. The western dwarf hornbill was formerly considered to be conspecific with the eastern dwarf hornbill (Horizocerus granti) with the English name "black dwarf hornbill".

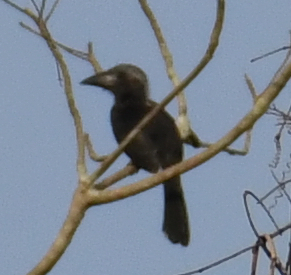
In tree

== Description ==
It is black with a curved beak and a wide white brow above its eye.
