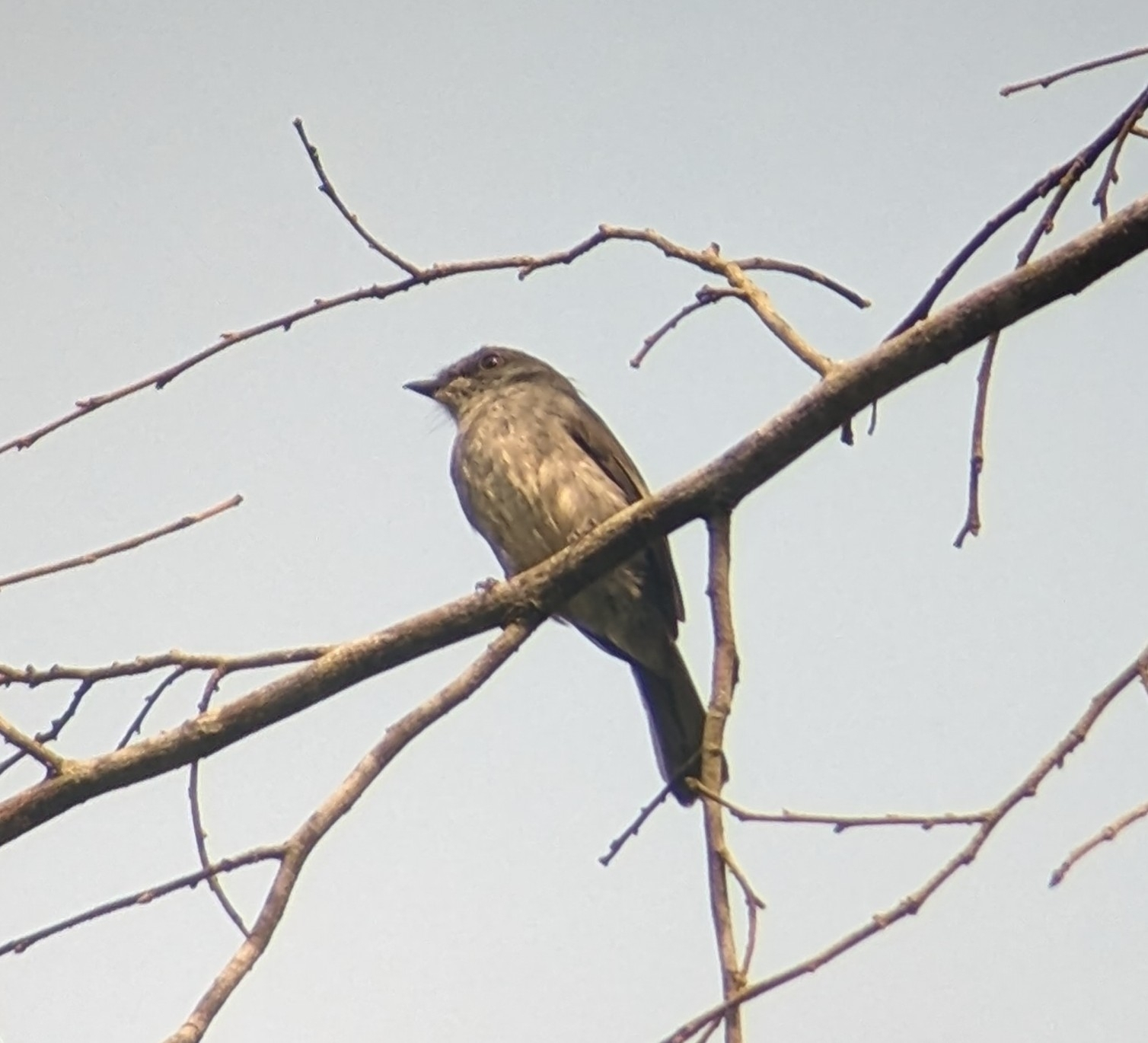

Conservation status
- Least Concern (IUCN 3.1)

Scientific classification
- Kingdom: Animalia
- Phylum: Chordata
- Class: Aves
- Order: Passeriformes
- Family: Muscicapidae
- Genus: Fraseria
- Species: F. tessmanni

Binomial name
- Fraseria tessmanni (Reichenow, 1907)

Synonyms
- Psalidoprocne tessmanni Reichenow, 1907; Muscicapa tessmanni (Reichenow, 1907)

= Tessmann's flycatcher =

Species of bird

Tessmann's flycatcher (Fraseria tessmanni) is a species of bird in the family Muscicapidae. It is sparsely distributed across the African tropical rainforest from Sierra Leone to the Democratic Republic of the Congo. Its natural habitat is subtropical or tropical moist shrubland.

== Taxonomy ==
Tessmann's flycatcher was formally described in 1907 by the German ornithologist Anton Reichenow under given the binomial name Psalidoprocne tessmanni. The specific epithet was chosen to honour the German anthropologist and collector Günter Tessmann (1889–1971). Tessmann's flycatcher is now one of eight species placed in the genus Fraseria that was introduced in 1854 by the French naturalist Charles Lucien Bonaparte. The species is monotypic: no subspecies are recognised.
