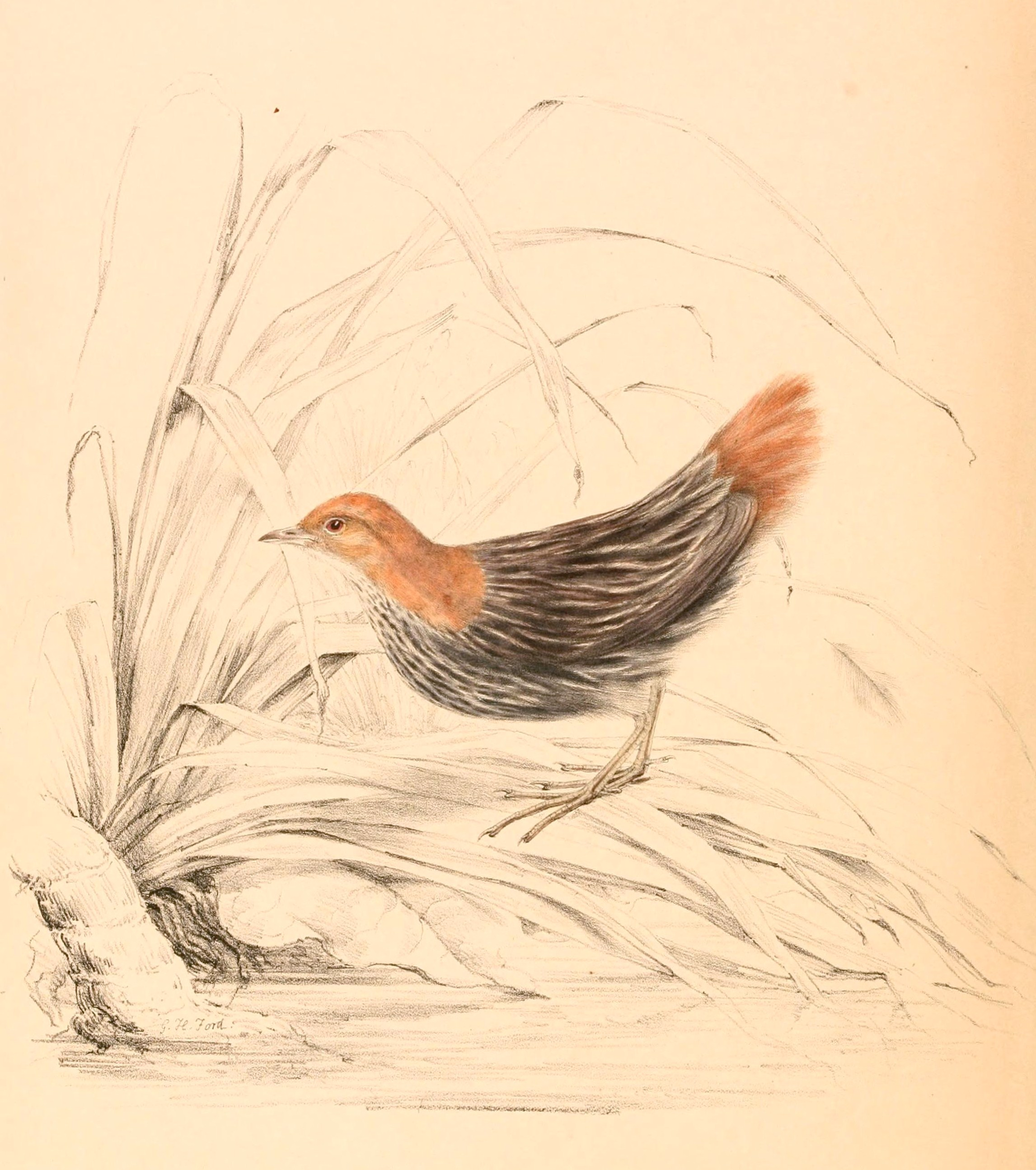
- S. affinis affinis

Conservation status
- Least Concern (IUCN 3.1)

Scientific classification
- Kingdom: Animalia
- Phylum: Chordata
- Class: Aves
- Order: Gruiformes
- Family: Sarothruridae
- Genus: Sarothrura
- Species: S. affinis

Binomial name
- Sarothrura affinis (Smith, 1828)

Synonyms
- Sarothrura lineata

= Striped flufftail =

Species of bird

The striped flufftail (Sarothrura affinis) is a species of bird in the flufftail family Sarothruridae. It is also known as the red-tailed flufftail. The species is closely related to the Madagascar flufftail. The species has a disjunct distribution across the Afromontane of southeastern Africa, with two subspecies. The nominate subspecies S. a. affinis is found in eastern South Africa and Eswatini. S. a. antonii, named for German ornithologist Anton Reichenow, is found in eastern Zimbabwe and Mozambique, Malawi, southern Tanzania, Kenya and the south of South Sudan.

The striped flufftail is a small rail-like bird, 14 to 15 cm (5.5–5.9 in) long. Males weigh between 25–30 g (0.88–1.06 oz), no information exists about the weight of females. The wingspan is 23 to 24 cm (9.1–9.4 in). The male has a chestnut head, white throat, and black body streaked with white with a yellowish wash. The female is brown with lighter barring and a pale belly. S. a. antonii is different from the nominate in having the chestnut of the head coming down to the breast, and in being larger.

The species occupies a range of habitats and altitudes, being found at sea level in South Africa and up to 3,700 m (12,100 ft) in Kenya. The species is mostly found in alpine grasslands, usually near water, and requires good cover with some clear ground. In South Africa, at lower altitudes, it is found in fynbos.

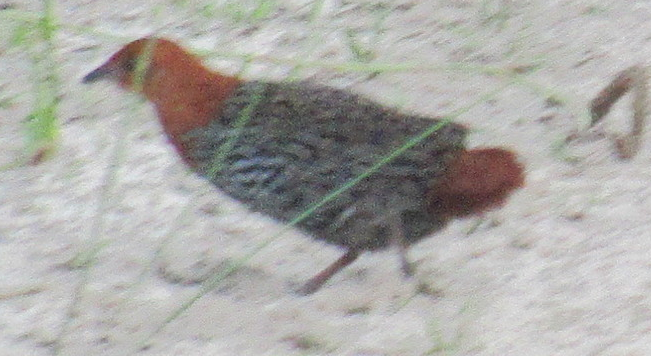

The striped flufftail feeds on a range of insects including beetles, caterpillars, ants, termites, flies, crickets and bugs, as well as spiders and seeds. They typically feed in open ground. Breeding happens during the local rainy season. Pairs hold territories year-round, with a smaller breeding territory and a larger home range. The nest is a bowl of dry grass set in a grass tuft.
