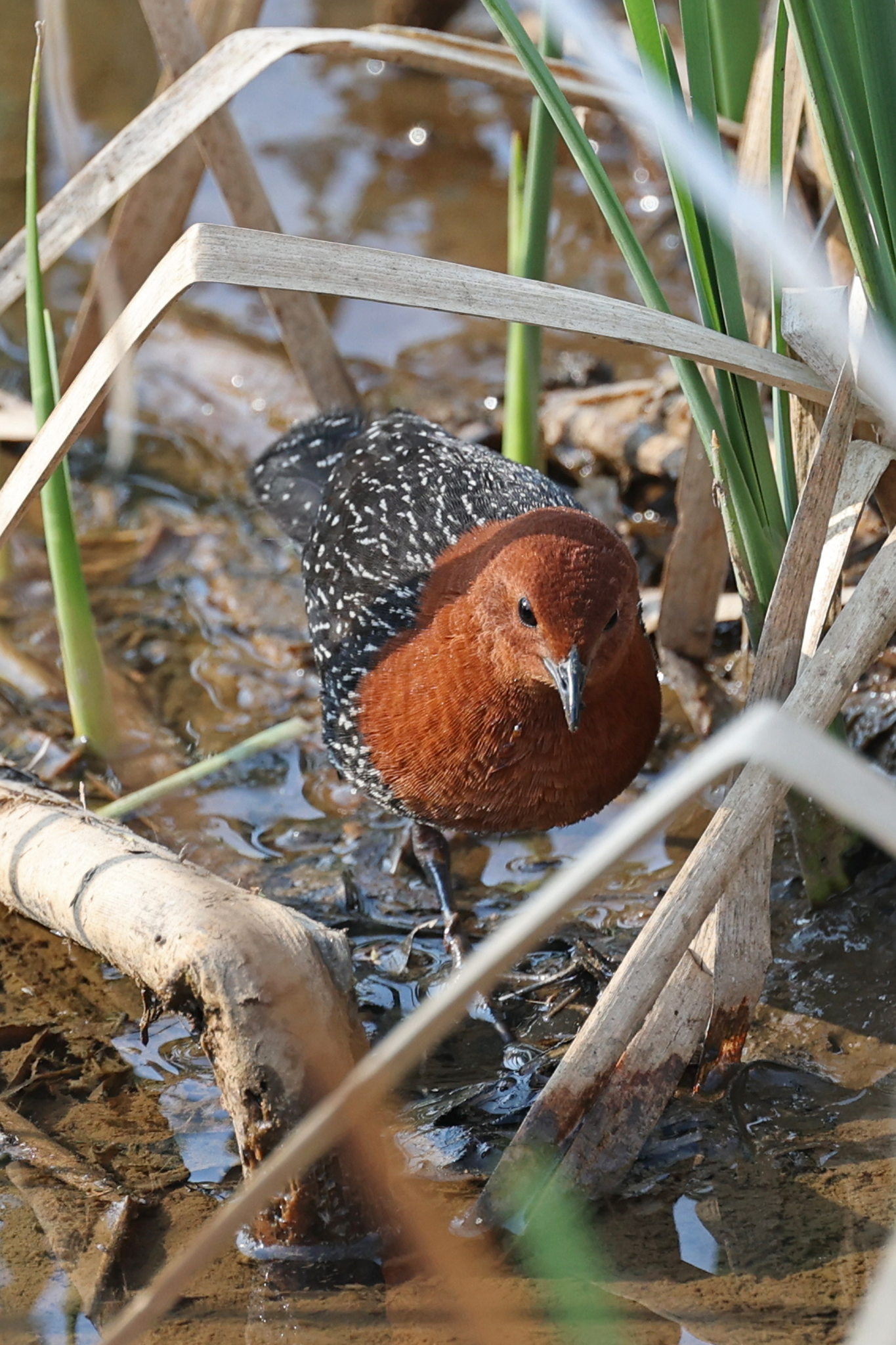

Conservation status
- Least Concern (IUCN 3.1)

Scientific classification
- Kingdom: Animalia
- Phylum: Chordata
- Class: Aves
- Order: Gruiformes
- Family: Sarothruridae
- Genus: Sarothrura
- Species: S. rufa

Binomial name
- Sarothrura rufa (Vieillot, 1819)

= Red-chested flufftail =

Species of bird

The red-chested flufftail (Sarothrura rufa) is a species of bird in the family Sarothruridae. It is found in sub-Saharan Africa from Liberia to Ethiopia and south to South Africa.

The red-chested flufftail prefers habitats with greater canopy cover. It can be found in environments near white-winged flufftails, but tends to avoid direct spacial overlap.
