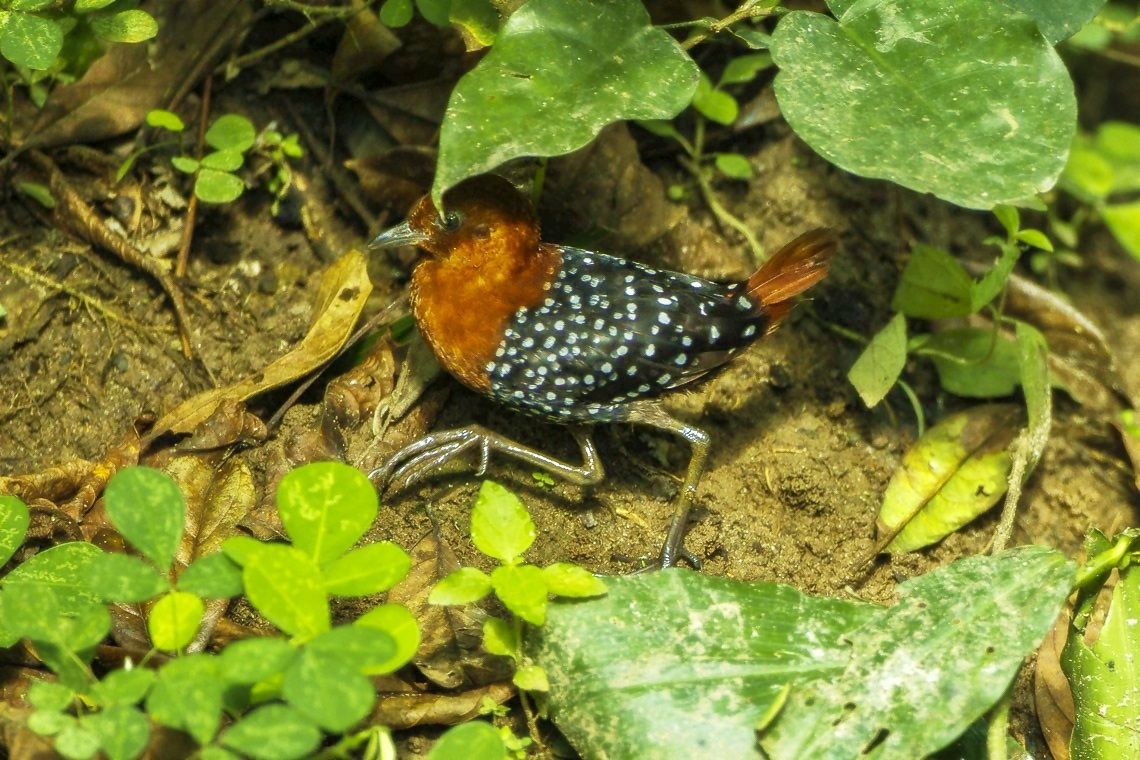
- White-spotted flufftail

Scientific classification
- Kingdom: Animalia
- Phylum: Chordata
- Class: Aves
- Order: Gruiformes
- Family: Sarothruridae
- Genus: Sarothrura; Heine, 1890

Type species
- Gallinula jardinei A. Smith, 1839

Species
- see list

Synonyms
- "Corethrura" Reichenbach, 1845? fide G.R.Gray, 1846 (nomen nudum); Corethrura Reichenbach, 1849 (non Hope, 1843: preoccupied); Daseioura Penhallurick, 2003; Lemurolimnas Salomonsen, 1934; Saurothrura Sharpe, 1894

= Flufftail =

Genus of birds

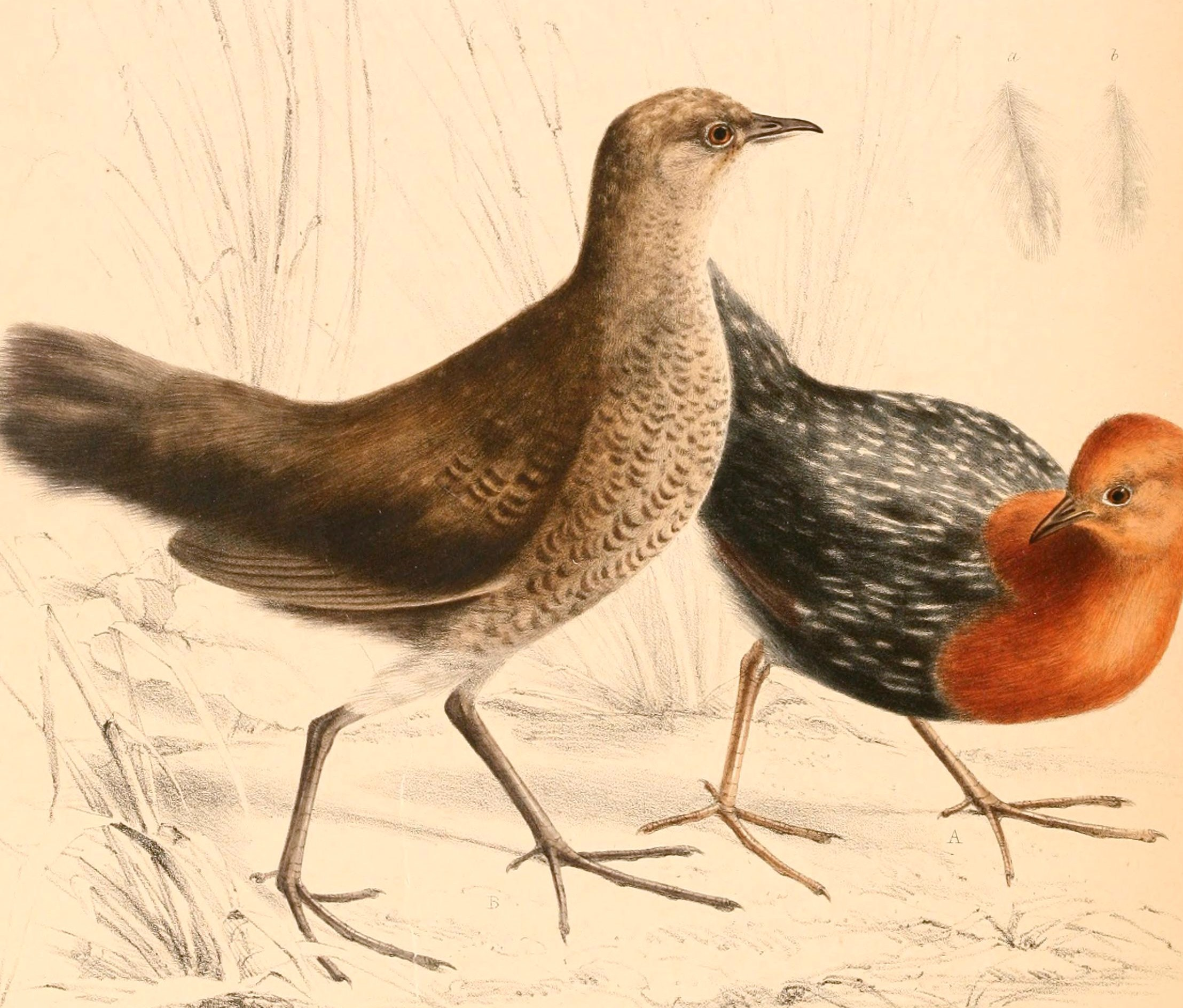
A display of sexual dimorphism in two red-chested flufftails. A young female is shown on the left, and an adult male is shown on the right.

Flufftails (genus Sarothrura) are small birds related to rails and finfoots. There are nine species, seven of which are distributed across sub-Saharan Africa, with the remaining two in Madagascar. The genus was long placed with the rail family Rallidae, but is now placed in the family Sarothruridae, along with three other species of wood rails (genus Canirallus).

== Taxonomy ==
The genus Sarothrura was introduced in 1890 by the German ornithologist Ferdinand Heine as a replacement name for Corethrura that Ludwig Reichenbach had introduced in 1853. The name Corethrura was preoccupied as it had been used for a different genus in 1846 by the English zoologist George Gray. The type species was specified by Reichenbach as Gallinula jardinei A. Smith 1839, which a junior synonym of Crex affinis A. Smith, 1828, the striped flufftail. The genus name Sarothrura combines the Ancient Greek σαρωτρον/sarōtron meaning "broom" with ουρα/oura meaning "tail".

The genus contains nine species:

- White-spotted flufftail, Sarothrura pulchra – west and central Africa
- Buff-spotted flufftail, Sarothrura elegans – widespread across Africa
- Red-chested flufftail, Sarothrura rufa – widespread across Africa
- Chestnut-headed flufftail, Sarothrura lugens – scattered across central Africa
- Streaky-breasted flufftail, Sarothrura boehmi – locally in wet grassland of central Africa
- Striped flufftail, Sarothrura affinis – eastern and southern Africa
- Madagascar flufftail, Sarothrura insularis – humid forest of eastern and northwestern Madagascar
- White-winged flufftail, Sarothrura ayresi – highlands of Ethiopia and eastern South Africa
- Slender-billed flufftail, Sarothrura watersi – highlands of eastern Madagascar

== Description ==
The group's common name is derived from the short tail which has degraded fluffy feathers. All species except the white-winged flufftail display sexual dimorphism in their plumage but not their size. The bodies of males are mostly black, with each species having a characteristic pattern of white spots or streaks. The heads of males are chestnut-colored. Female plumage is predominantly black or brown, paired with the same characteristic patterns. There are some exceptions, however, such as the white-spotted females that also carry the chestnut coloration of their males.

== Distribution and habitat ==
Flufftails are highly secretive and seldom observed. Two species, the buff-spotted flufftail and the white-spotted flufftail, are inhabitants of dense forests and wetlands, while the remaining species are found in deep grasslands and marshes. The red-chested flufftail and the chestnut-headed flufftail share the same habitat. They often compete with one another, with the former being the more successful species. One species, the streaky-breasted flufftail, is known to be migratory, leaving Africa during the dry season. It is uncertain whether other species are as well; the white-winged flufftail may breed in Ethiopia and winter in South Africa but this is not known for certain. The first breeding population in the South African highlands was recorded via camera trap in 2018.

== Behavior ==
The breeding behavior of the flufftails has not been observed for many species. The use of camera traps and audio devices has helped capture vocalizations of these cryptic birds. Many species breed in the wet season. All species are highly vocal during the breeding season, with repertoires including duets. In the Madagascar flufftail the courtship behavior consists of duetting, nest building (which is undertaken by the male), nest visits by the female, and copulation. Flufftails build domed nests; the nest of the Madagascar flufftail is positioned high above the ground in vines, and the nest of the white-winged flufftail is placed in reeds over waterlogged ground. The eggs of all the species that have been studied are white, unlike most rails. The chicks are covered in black down at birth and have a slightly colored bill; adult plumage is quickly attained in most species. Both parents care for the chicks.

=== Food and feeding ===
White-winged flufftails feed on insects, crustaceans, and plant seeds in their wetland environment. White-winged flufftails are waders, and wait for mature seeds to drop into the water.

== Status and conservation ==
Although most of the species within this genus are classified to be of least concern, the majority of their populations are decreasing. The white-winged flufftail is currently considered critically endangered by the IUCN, and the slender-billed flufftail is classified as near threatened. They are threatened with habitat loss caused by the draining of wetlands for cultivation and a limited amount of suitable breeding sites. Other anthropogenic activities such as excessive cattle grazing, unplanned fires, mining, pollution, erosion, and construction contribute to their habitat degradation by creating drier conditions. It has been difficult to development conservation management strategies for the white-winged flufftail due to data deficiencies and unknown habitat requirements. Prohibiting grazing in peatlands during breeding season is one solution to prevent alterations to vegetation structure. Population bottlenecks have reduced the diversity estimate patterns of the white-winged flufftail compared to estimates of the stable red-chested flufftail. Having lower genetic diversity makes it harder for the species to adapt to environmental changes, in addition to the introduction of novel diseases as their habitat continues to fragment.
