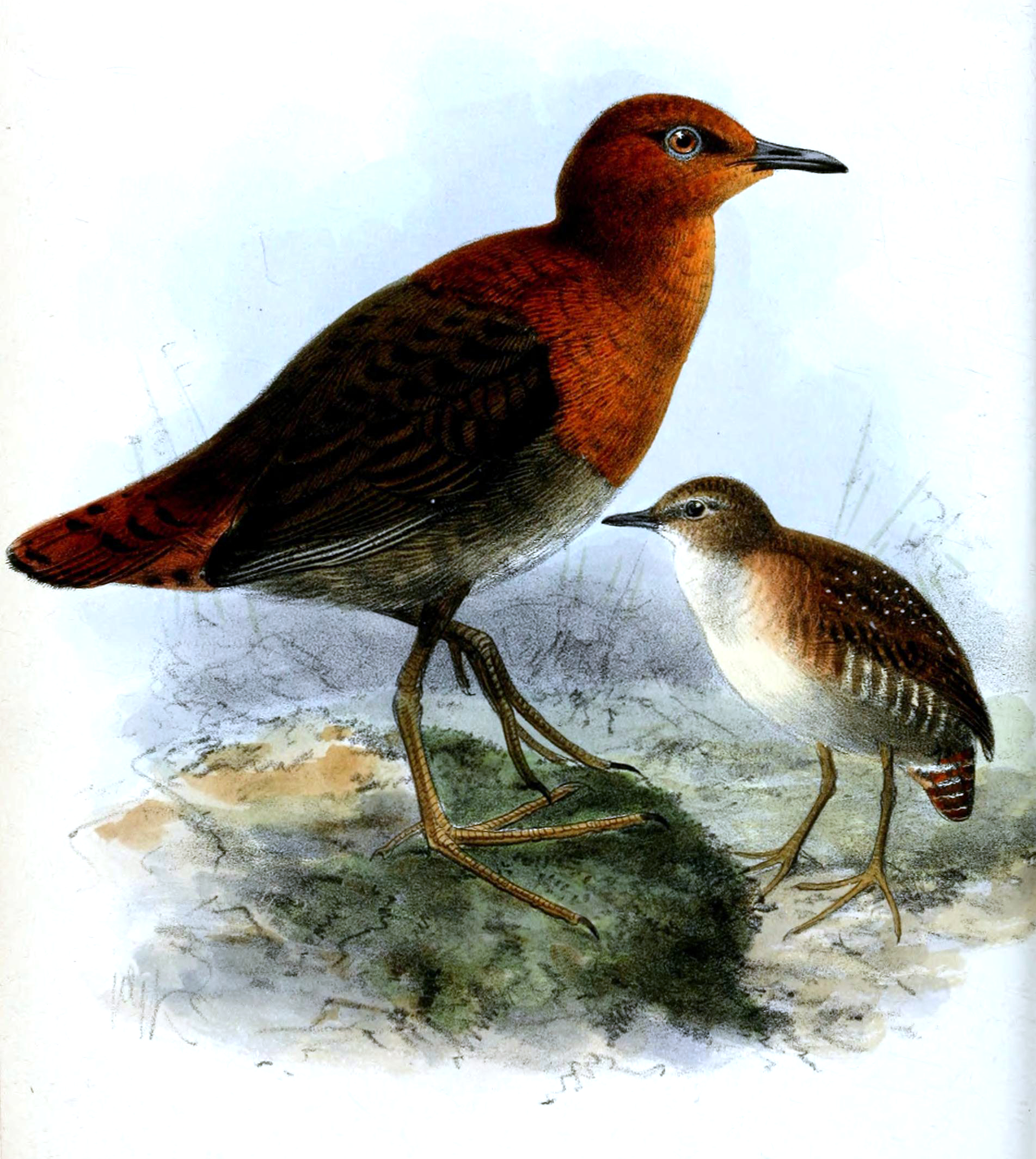

Conservation status
- Near Threatened (IUCN 3.1)

Scientific classification
- Kingdom: Animalia
- Phylum: Chordata
- Class: Aves
- Order: Gruiformes
- Family: Sarothruridae
- Genus: Sarothrura
- Species: S. watersi

Binomial name
- Sarothrura watersi (Bartlett, E, 1880)

= Slender-billed flufftail =

Species of bird

The slender-billed flufftail (Sarothrura watersi) is a species of bird in the family Sarothruridae. It is found in highlands of eastern Madagascar.

Its natural habitats are swamps and arable land. It is threatened by habitat loss.
