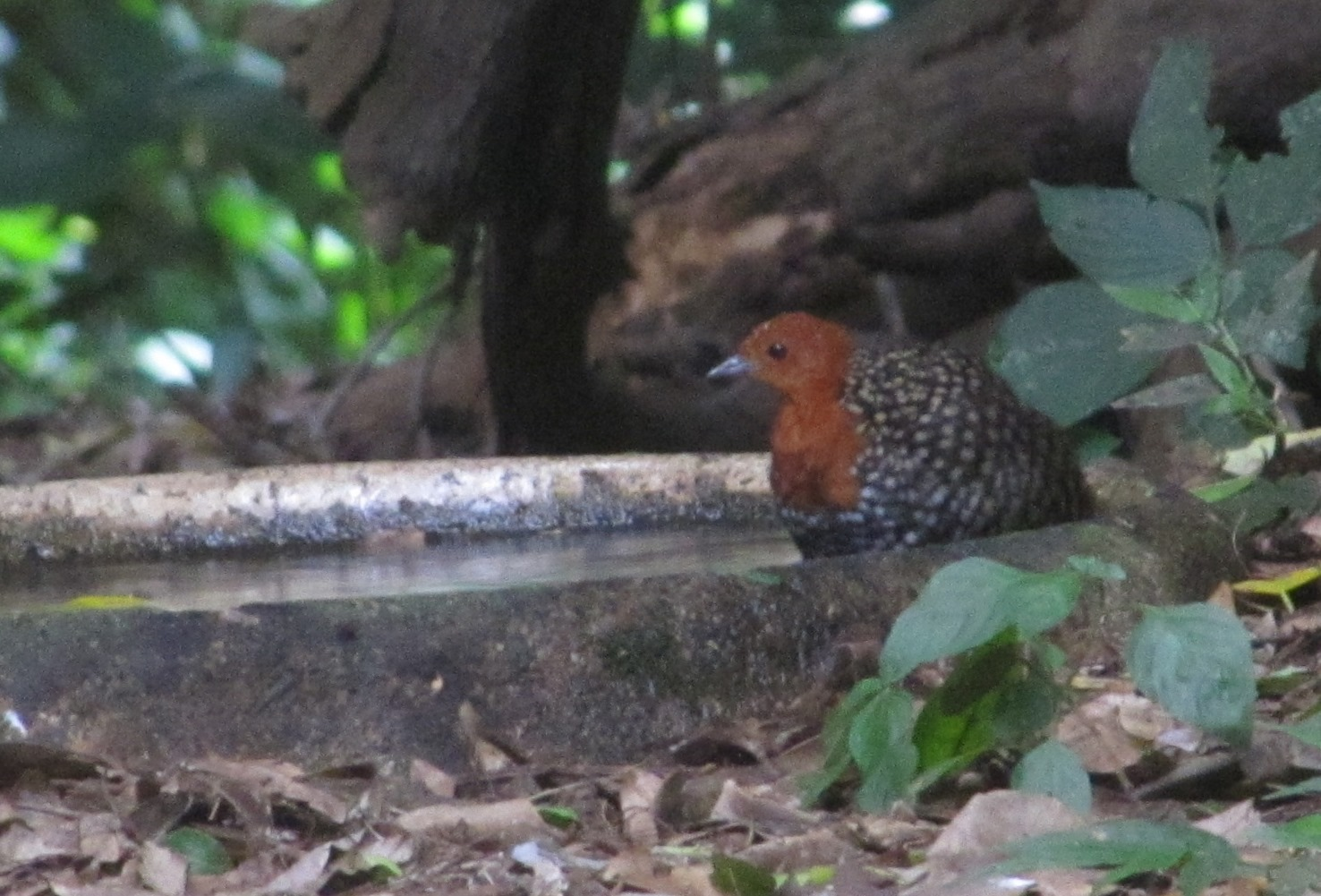

Conservation status
- Least Concern (IUCN 3.1)

Scientific classification
- Kingdom: Animalia
- Phylum: Chordata
- Class: Aves
- Order: Gruiformes
- Family: Sarothruridae
- Genus: Sarothrura
- Species: S. elegans

Binomial name
- Sarothrura elegans (Smith, 1839)

Synonyms
- Coturnicops elegans

= Buff-spotted flufftail =

Species of bird

The buff-spotted flufftail (Sarothrura elegans), also known as the buff-spotted crake, is a species of bird in the family Sarothruridae.

== Description ==
The male has an orange head, neck, and breast, with a sooty-black body covered in buff or white spots. The female is mostly brownish, barred and spotted with black and buff. In general size, this bird measures 15–17 cm (5.9–6.7 in) in length and has a wingspan of 25–28 cm (9.8–11.0 in). It weighs about 46 g (1.6 oz) on average.

Subspecies S. e. reichenovi is smaller than the nominate, and the males are darker above and have larger spots.

S. e. reichenovi measurements
	Male	Female
Wing	80–91 mm (3.1–3.6 in)	82–92 mm (3.2–3.6 in)
Total culmen	14.5–17.5 mm (0.57–0.69 in)	14.5–17 mm (0.57–0.67 in)
Tarsus	22–26.5 mm (0.87–1.04 in)	23–28 mm (0.91–1.10 in)
Tail	33–40 mm (1.3–1.6 in)	32–41 mm (1.3–1.6 in)

S. e. elegans is the nominate subspecies.

S. e. elegans measurements
	Male	Female
Wing	83–95 mm (3.3–3.7 in)	84–96 mm (3.3–3.8 in)
Total culmen	15–18.5 mm (0.59–0.73 in)	15–18 mm (0.59–0.71 in)
Tarsus	23–27 mm (0.91–1.06 in)	23–27.5 mm (0.91–1.08 in)
Tail	35–47 mm (1.4–1.9 in)	35–45 mm (1.4–1.8 in)

== Ecology ==
The buff-spotted flufftail inhabits many types of forested areas in Africa.

Its diet is semi-omnivorous, consisting of various invertebrates as well as grass and tree seeds, which are thought to aid it in grinding other foods. It mainly forages through leaf litter. They will drink water daily, sometimes several times a day. It rarely flies.

The buff-spotted flufftail is monogamous and territorial, and maintains pair bonds through the breeding season, which varies significantly by location. Its nest is on the ground and is well covered by plants. The nest is built by the male over 2–3 days, made of grass and dead leaves, and often other plant material. In S. e. elegans, the eggs can be 26.0–31.3 mm (1.02–1.23 in) in length and 20.6–22.8 mm (0.81–0.90 in) in width, and are estimated to weigh about 6.6 g (0.23 oz). There are 3–5 eggs per clutch, which are incubated for 15–16 days. Typically, the male will incubate during the day and the female at night. Chicks hatch precocial and leave the nest within one to two days, and can forage after three days, but their parents will continue to feed them until independence, when they are 19–21 days old in which they will be driver off by their parents. They can also start flying at this time. Adult mass is achieved at around 45 days.

== Status ==
The buff-spotted flufftail is widespread and locally common, and it is not globally threatened. In urban areas, domestic cats and dogs are a major threat to their populations.

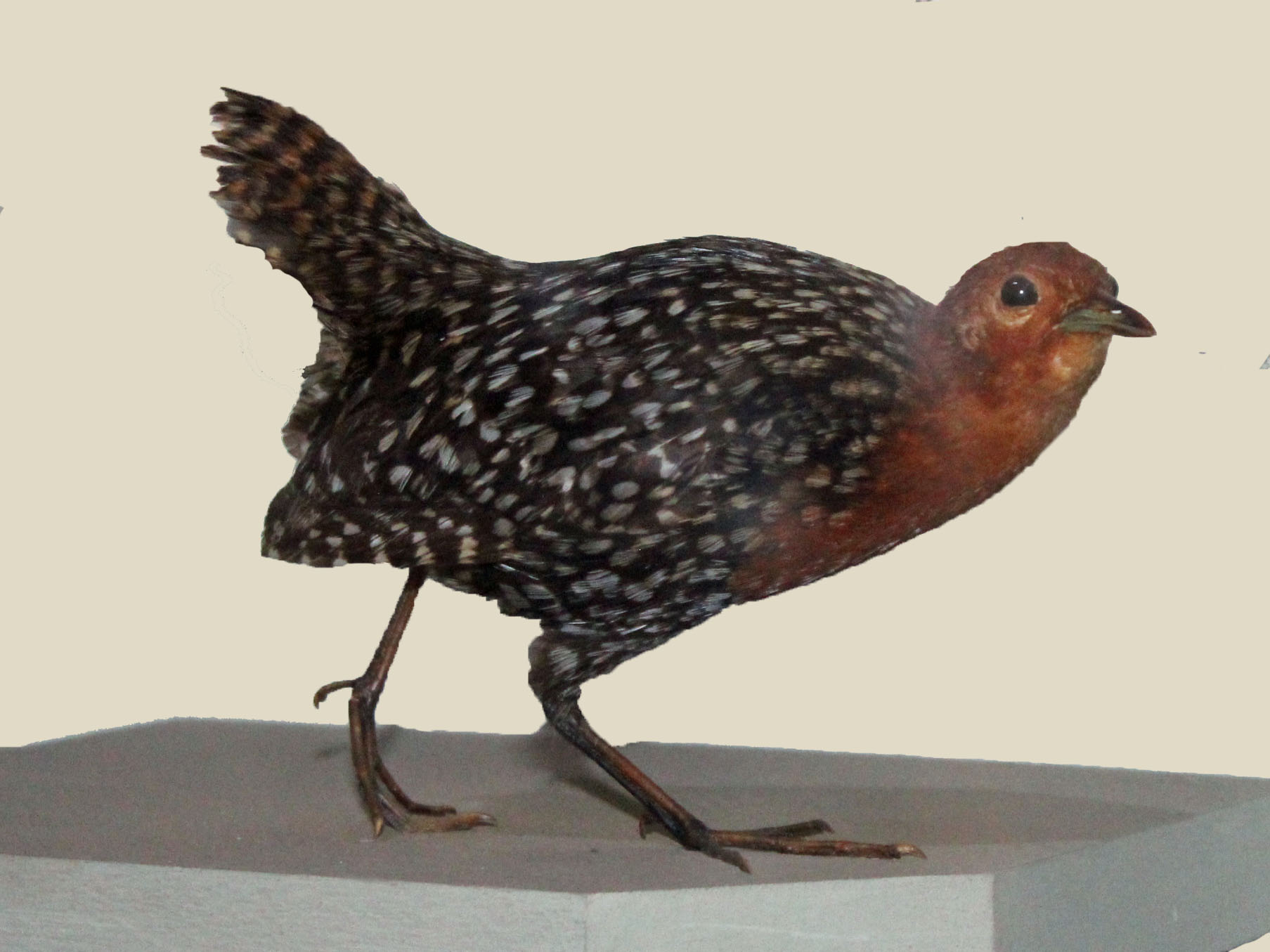
Specimen at Nairobi National Museum
