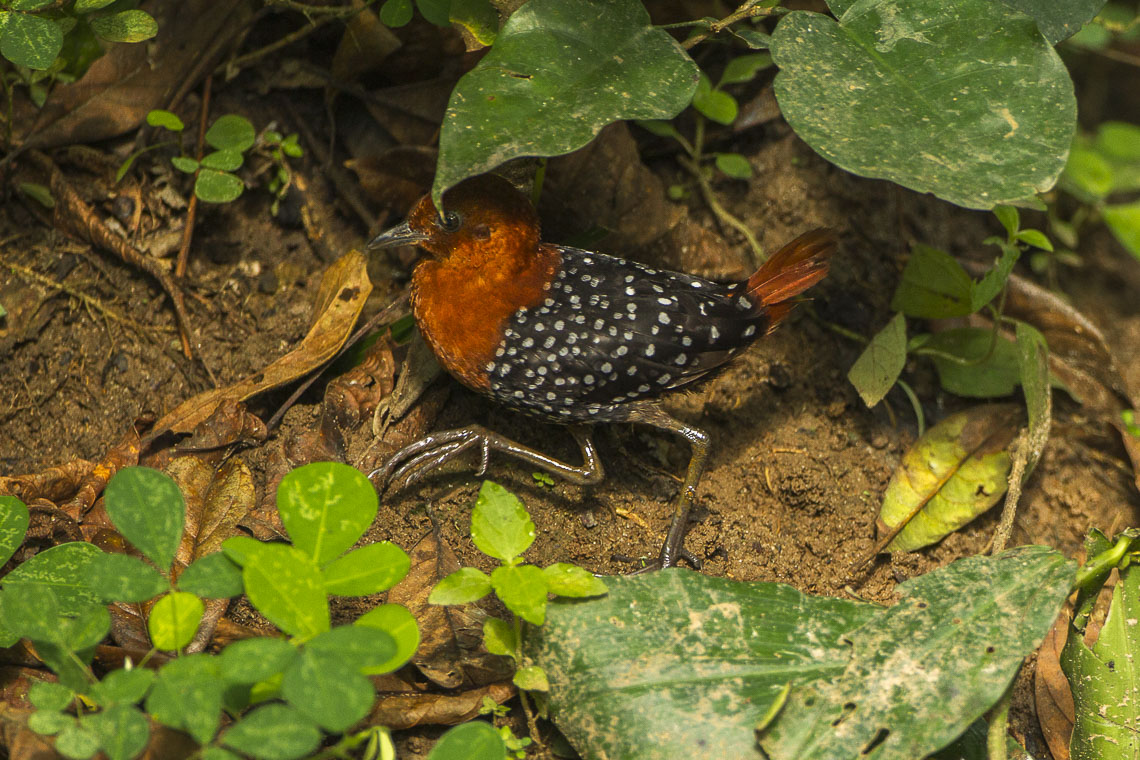
- Male white-spotted flufftail

Conservation status
- Least Concern (IUCN 3.1)

Scientific classification
- Kingdom: Animalia
- Phylum: Chordata
- Class: Aves
- Order: Gruiformes
- Family: Sarothruridae
- Genus: Sarothrura
- Species: S. pulchra

Binomial name
- Sarothrura pulchra (Gray, JE, 1829)

Synonyms
- Crex Pulchra (protonym)

= White-spotted flufftail =

Species of bird

The white-spotted flufftail (Sarothrura pulchra), also known as the white-spotted crake, is a species of bird in the family Sarothruridae. It has a widespread range of presence across the African tropical rainforest.

== Subspecies ==
The subspecies vary slightly in size, S. p. zenkeri and S. p. centralis are the smallest.

- S. p. pulchra
- S. p. zenkeri
- S. p. centralis
- S. p. batesi (sometimes considered synonymous with S. p. zenkeri or S. p. centralis)

== Description ==
This bird is 16–17 cm (6.3–6.7 in) in length and weighs about 45 grams on average. The tail is short and despite the name, it is not fluffy. The male is red on its head, neck, breast, and tail coverts, and it black with spotted white on the rest of its body. The female's head, neck and breast are similar and its body is black to dark brownish.

Standard Measurements
	Male	Female
Wing	76–88 mm (3.0–3.5 in)	77–89 mm (3.0–3.5 in)
Tail	36–43 mm (1.4–1.7 in)	36–46 mm (1.4–1.8 in)
Total culmen	15–19 mm (0.59–0.75 in)	15–18 mm (0.59–0.71 in)
Tarsus	28–32 mm (1.1–1.3 in)	28–32 mm (1.1–1.3 in)
Weight	39–49 g (1.4–1.7 oz)	41–49 g (1.4–1.7 oz)

== Ecology ==
This species is normally sedentary but there is some evidence for local movement in Sierra Leone and Ghana. The white-spotted flufftail feeds on various invertebrates. They are exclusively diurnal, and are active throughout the day but less active in the middle of the day.

The white-spotted flufftail is monogamous and territorial, and forms strong pair bonds. Their territory is about one hectare. The breeding season varies by location. The nest is an oval mound of leaves and built by the male. Two eggs are laid per clutch, which measure 30–30.9 mm (1.18–1.22 in) in length and 21.5–22.1 mm (0.85–0.87 in) in width; estimated to weigh about 7.7 g (0.27 oz). The incubation period takes 14 days and is performed by both sexes. The chicks are born with black down and are precocial. They are fed by both parents, but tend to follow the parent of the same sex. Chicks can feed themselves at 3 weeks of age and fly after 30–35 days. They associate closely with their parents until fully grown at 6–7 weeks, but they may remain in their parental territory for up to nine months.
