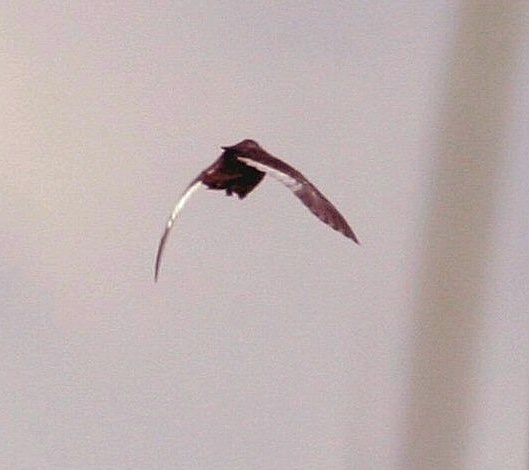
- In Mpumalanga, South Africa

Conservation status
- Critically Endangered (IUCN 3.1)

Scientific classification
- Kingdom: Animalia
- Phylum: Chordata
- Class: Aves
- Order: Gruiformes
- Family: Sarothruridae
- Genus: Sarothrura
- Species: S. ayresi

Binomial name
- Sarothrura ayresi (Gurney, JH Sr, 1877)

Synonyms
- Coturnicops ayresi; Ortygops macmillani (Bannerman 1911)

= White-winged flufftail =

Species of bird

The white-winged flufftail (Sarothrura ayresi) is a very rare African bird in the family Sarothruridae. The estimated global population size of white-winged flufftails is less than 250 adults. These birds reside in Ethiopia and South Africa but it is unknown whether these populations are one large or two different populations.

Both sexes have dull plumage, dark crowns, and when flying show white secondary feathers.

Their habitat consists of high altitude seasonal marshland with high sedge cover to protect their ground nests. Habitat loss is the main problem facing these birds as they require highly specialized habitat. These marshlands are being destroyed for a number of reasons such as, farming, grazing and sedge harvesting, but some efforts are being taken to protect the white-winged flufftail.

== Description ==
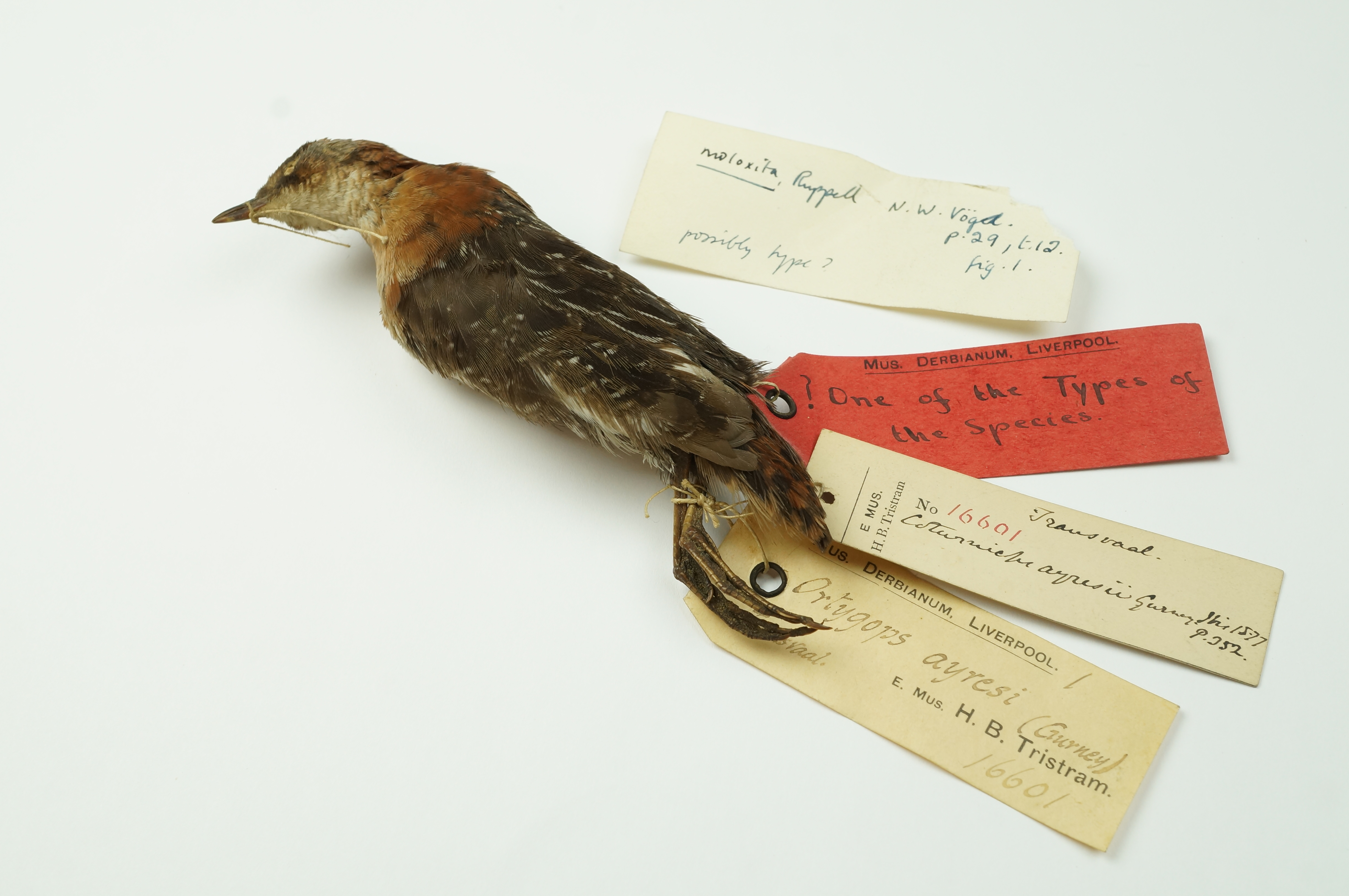
Specimen NML-VZ T16601 Sarothrura ayresi held in the Vertebrate Zoology collection at World Museum, National Museums Liverpool

Its scientific name honours South African ornithologist Thomas Ayres, who discovered it at Potchefstroom. (Note: The once extensive Potchefstroom marshes have since been reduced to small remnants. See: Sam de Beer (2001), Nick Jonas (2004) Potchefstroom and environs)

It resembles its relatives in the Flufftail genus, but both sexes have dull plumage and dark crowns. In flight both sexes also show distinctive white secondary feathers, a feature shared only with the related genus Coturnicops.

Non-breeding birds call only at dawn and dusk, sometimes in duet.

All those in the flufftail genus are native to Africa; however, none are more endangered than the white-winged flufftail.

== Distribution ==
The species has a seemingly disjunct range, being found north of the equator in Ethiopia, and south of it in Zambia, Zimbabwe and South Africa. Historically, it was believed to breed only in Ethiopia, though in 2018, it was recorded breeding in South Africa. However, it is still uncertain whether the northern and southern populations are distinct or if they are one large population.

The following suggests that they are one interbreeding population. First, their physical features appear identical. Second, new evidence shows a lack of significant difference in immunity gene alleles. Third, there were only three spots found that differed in their mitochondrial DNA. Although, while possibly being one population, the mitochondrial DNA suggests that the population may currently be genetically separating.

On the contrary, the following evidence suggests that the northern and southern populations are distinct. While three spots on the mitochondrial DNA may not seem like much, other differing bird subspecies also only have three or fewer sections of difference on their mitochondrial DNA. These studies were conducted on subspecies known to be different due to a landmass keeping them from breeding and/or the species differing in appearance.

The uncertainty of the white-winged flufftail's population status is the result of a low amount of research conducted on a rare bird.

== Habitat ==
Their natural habitat is highly specialized seasonal marshland of subtropical or tropical high-altitude grassland. The regions these birds reside in often have peat soil that helps grow the sedges prevalent in these seasonal marshlands.

It is a very local, and apparently only summer, visitor to highland marshes south of the equator. The birds are not resident in any of the few known sites, sometimes departing after as little as six weeks when conditions turn unfavourable.

The three Ethiopian sites are the Suluta Valley wetlands, the Berga wetlands and the Wersebi wetlands near Addis Ababa. The species was first found to breed at the Berga wetlands in 1997. Breeding has since been confirmed from the Wersebi wetlands and the Bilacha river wetland, close to Berga, which may be the main site. In South Africa they are regular at the Dullstroom and Wakkerstroom marshes, where public access is strictly regulated.

== Reproduction ==
Breeding season is estimated to be from June to September because this is when these birds have been spotted on breeding grounds. This is also thought to be the case due to the onset of the rainy season at this time.

These birds will lay about four to five eggs in hidden ground nests vulnerable to human and/or livestock traffic.

Nest sights are most likely chosen based on vegetation height and water depth since they prefer tall mixed sedges and shallow water.

== Conservation and status ==
The species is severely threatened by habitat loss, causes of which include grass trampling by cattle, grass cutting and drainage of swamps for pasture. Additional threats include flooding from dams, development of housing, and erosion. Regulated land management could improve the situation markedly.

In Ethiopia, human population growth adds pressure to crop farming, overgrazing, and harvesting sedges for livestock feed. Sedges, an important habitat feature for the white-winged flufftail, are also harvested for a local coffee brewing custom. Human alteration of this habitat such as water abstraction and grazing have changed the characteristics of these wetlands and are affecting the local fauna as a result. In 1997 it was estimated that 550 hectares of suitable habitat were available to the 210–215 breeding pairs in Ethiopia, but in 2020 only 232 hectares were estimated to house 55 breeding pairs.

The upper Berga wetlands had the best habitat available for nest sights but is under threat of habitat fragmentation. Weserbi wetlands are no longer suitable habitat due to unsustainable agriculture and the Bilacha wetlands are under the same threat of becoming unsuitable habitat.

The upper Berga wetlands should be prioritized for Ethiopian conservation. While efforts have been taken by Ethiopian Wildlife, Natural History Society, Middelpunt Weltand Trust, it has already been seen that the Weserbi wetland had its last white-winged flufftail sighting in 2003.

== Gallery ==
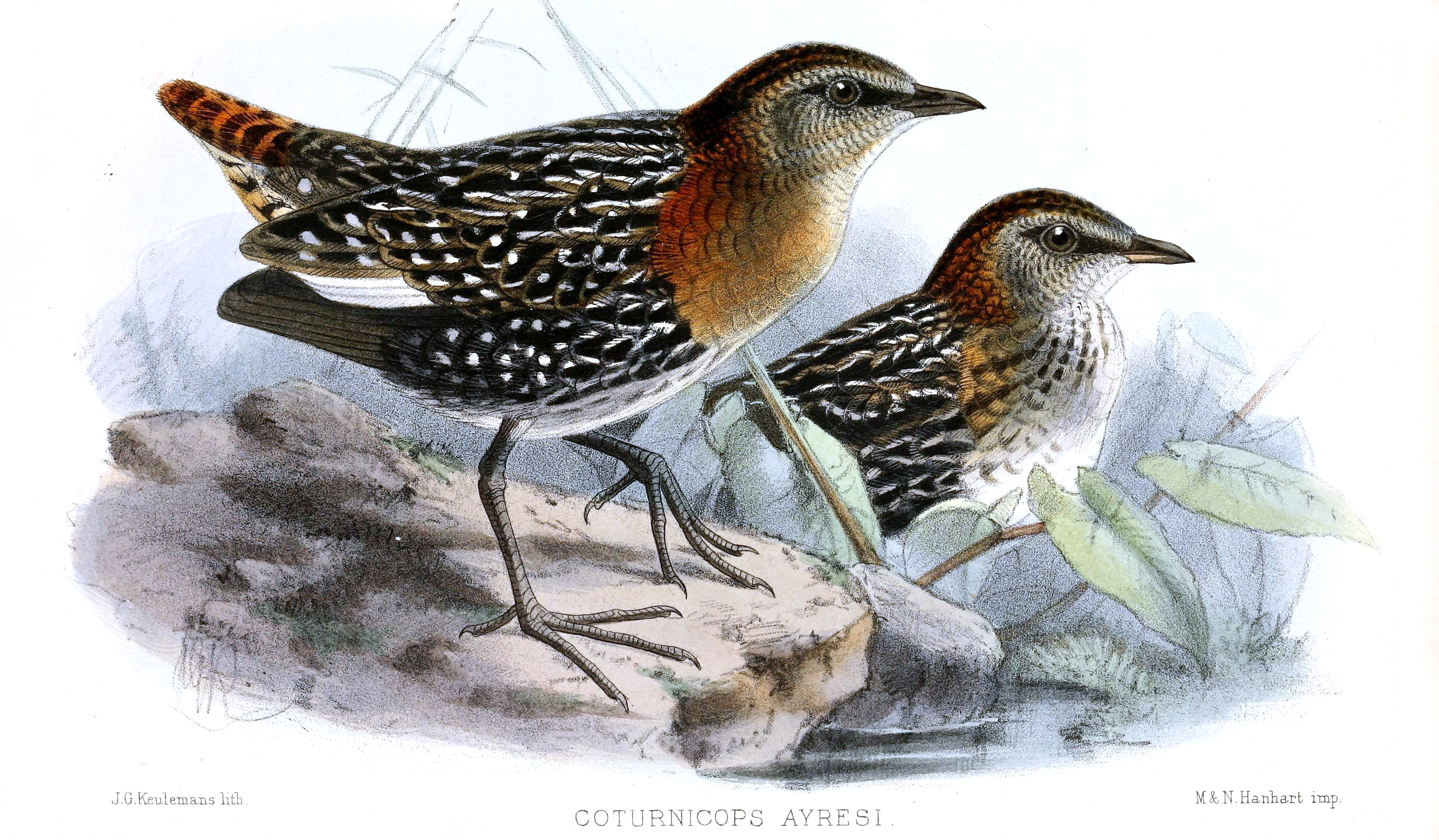
Male and female

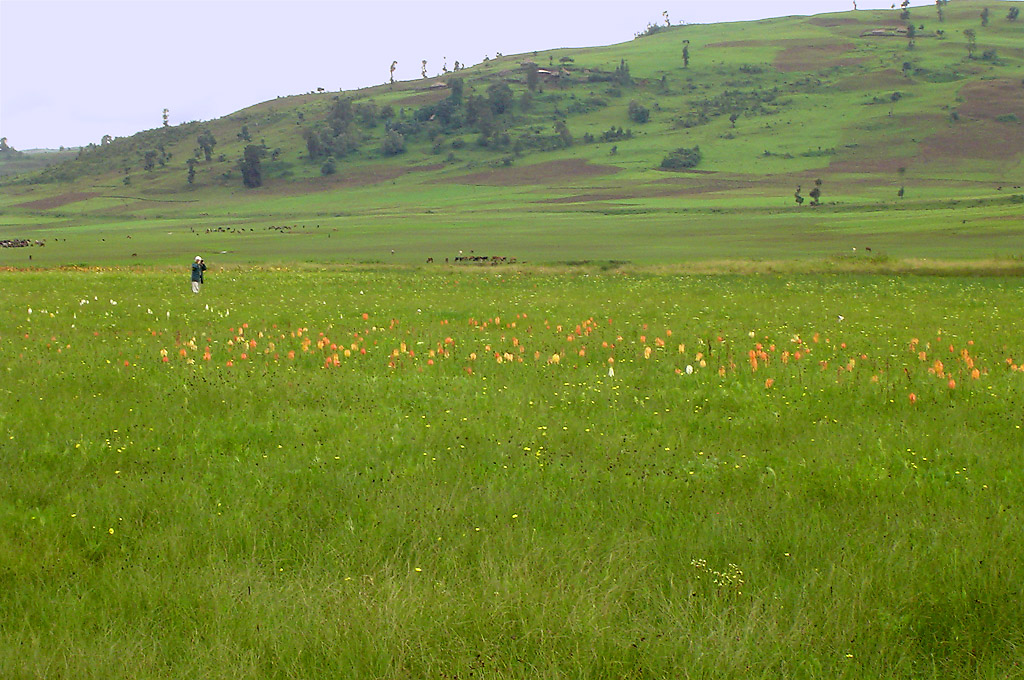
Berga wetland in Ethiopia, a breeding site

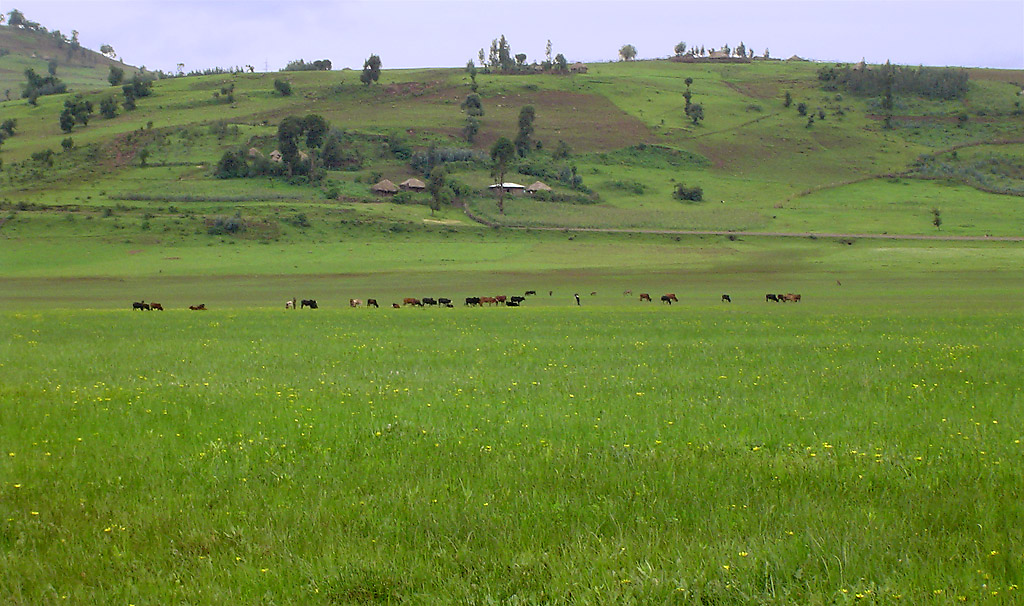
Cattle and habitation beside the wetland
