= Chestnut-headed flufftail =

Conservation status
- Least Concern (IUCN 3.1)

Scientific classification
- Kingdom: Animalia
- Phylum: Chordata
- Class: Aves
- Order: Gruiformes
- Family: Sarothruridae
- Genus: Sarothrura
- Species: S. lugens

Binomial name
- Sarothrura lugens (Böhm, 1884)
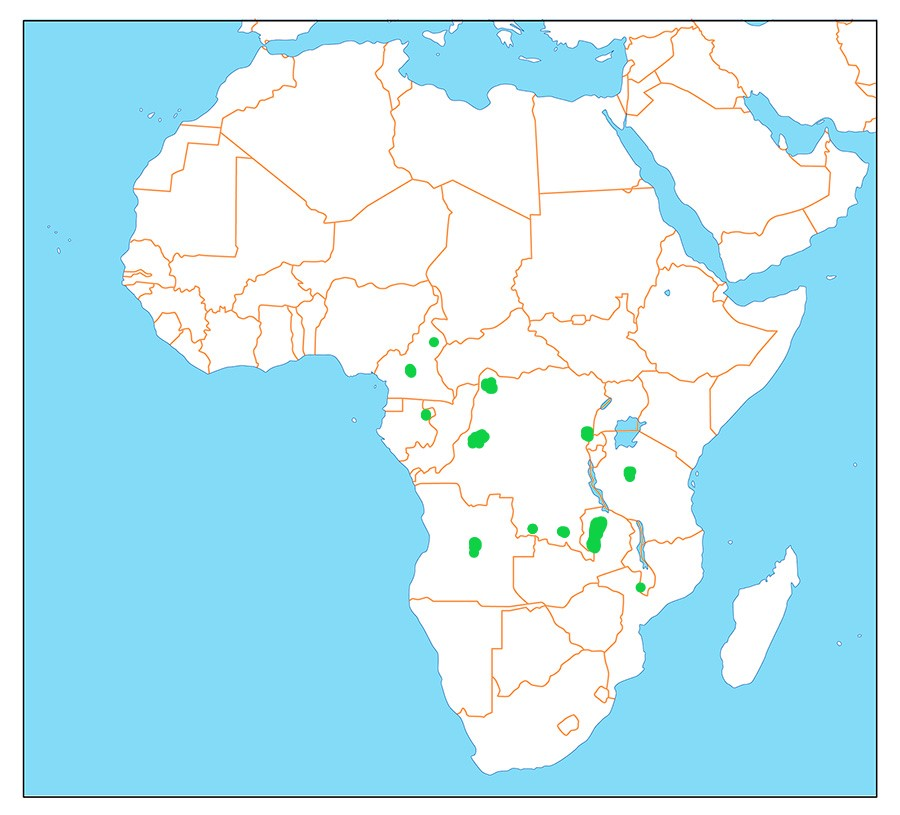
- Range of the chestnut-headed flufftail

Synonyms
- Crex lugeus (protonym)

Species of bird

The chestnut-headed flufftail (Sarothrura lugens) is a species of bird in the family Sarothruridae. It is found in Angola, Cameroon, Democratic Republic of the Congo, Gabon, Malawi, Rwanda, Tanzania, and Zambia.
