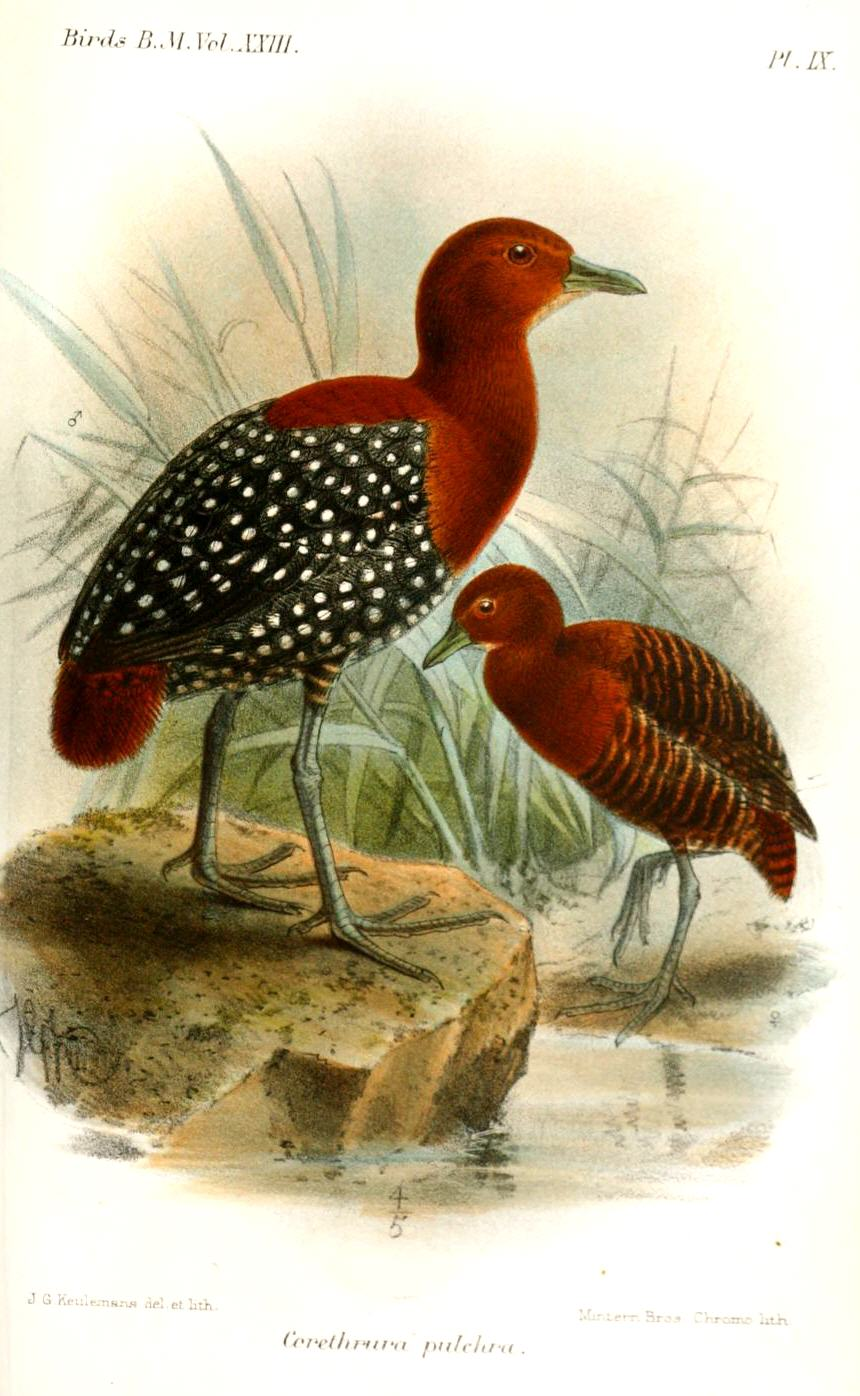
- White-spotted flufftail male (left) and female (right), showing the typical sexual dimorphism of this family

Scientific classification
- Domain: Eukaryota
- Kingdom: Animalia
- Phylum: Chordata
- Class: Aves
- Order: Gruiformes
- Suborder: Ralli
- Family: Sarothruridae; Verheyen, 1957

Genera
- Sarothrura; Mentocrex; Rallicula

= Sarothruridae =

Family of birds

Sarothruridae is a family of small- to medium-sized ground-living birds found mostly in Madagascar and sub-Saharan Africa, with the genus Rallicula being restricted to New Guinea and the Moluccas. The species in this family were once considered to sit with the larger rail family Rallidae.

These birds are highly similar to small plump Rallidae at a casual glance, and typically plumaged brown-and-black with lighter (white or beige) pattern. However, their eggs are pure white, lacking the spotting of Rallidae eggs. Except for Mentocrex, they have pronounced sexual dimorphism, while in Rallidae the sexes generally cannot be distinguished in the field. Sarothruridae males differ from females in basic coloration to a varying extent, and their wings and sometimes bellies are typically unpatterned, speckled, or adorned with lengthwise streaks; females, by contrast, have a barred pattern, in some species consisting of distinct spots arranged in vertical rows. Also, Rallidae have squealing, croaking, whistling or rasping vocalizations, often fairly high-pitched given their body size, while Sarothruridae have surprisingly (given their size) low-pitched hooting or moaning calls reminiscent of owls.

The family contains 3 genera.

- Genus Sarothrura (flufftails; 9 species)
  - White-spotted flufftail, Sarothrura pulchra
  - Buff-spotted flufftail, Sarothrura elegans
  - Red-chested flufftail, Sarothrura rufa
  - Chestnut-headed flufftail, Sarothrura lugens
  - Streaky-breasted flufftail, Sarothrura boehmi
  - Striped flufftail, Sarothrura affinis
  - Madagascar flufftail, Sarothrura insularis
  - White-winged flufftail, Sarothrura ayresi
  - Slender-billed flufftail, Sarothrura watersi
- Genus Mentocrex (Malagasy forest rails; 2 species) - formerly in Canirallus
  - Madagascar forest rail (Mentocrex kioloides)
  - Tsingy forest rail (Mentocrex beankaensis)
- Genus Rallicula (Asian forest rails; 4 species) - formerly in Rallina
  - White-striped forest rail (Rallicula leucospila)
  - Chestnut forest rail (Rallicula rubra)
  - Forbes's forest rail (Rallicula forbesi)
  - Mayr's forest rail (Rallicula mayri)
