= Streaky-breasted flufftail =

Conservation status
- Least Concern (IUCN 3.1)

Scientific classification
- Kingdom: Animalia
- Phylum: Chordata
- Class: Aves
- Order: Gruiformes
- Family: Sarothruridae
- Genus: Sarothrura
- Species: S. boehmi

Binomial name
- Sarothrura boehmi Reichenow, 1900

Species of bird

The streaky-breasted flufftail (Sarothrura boehmi) is a species of bird in the family Sarothruridae.

It is sparsely spread across wet grasslands of central Africa.

The name of this bird commemorates the German zoologist Richard Böhm.

Its nests are constructed of grass-stems and blades, and placed on the ground.
