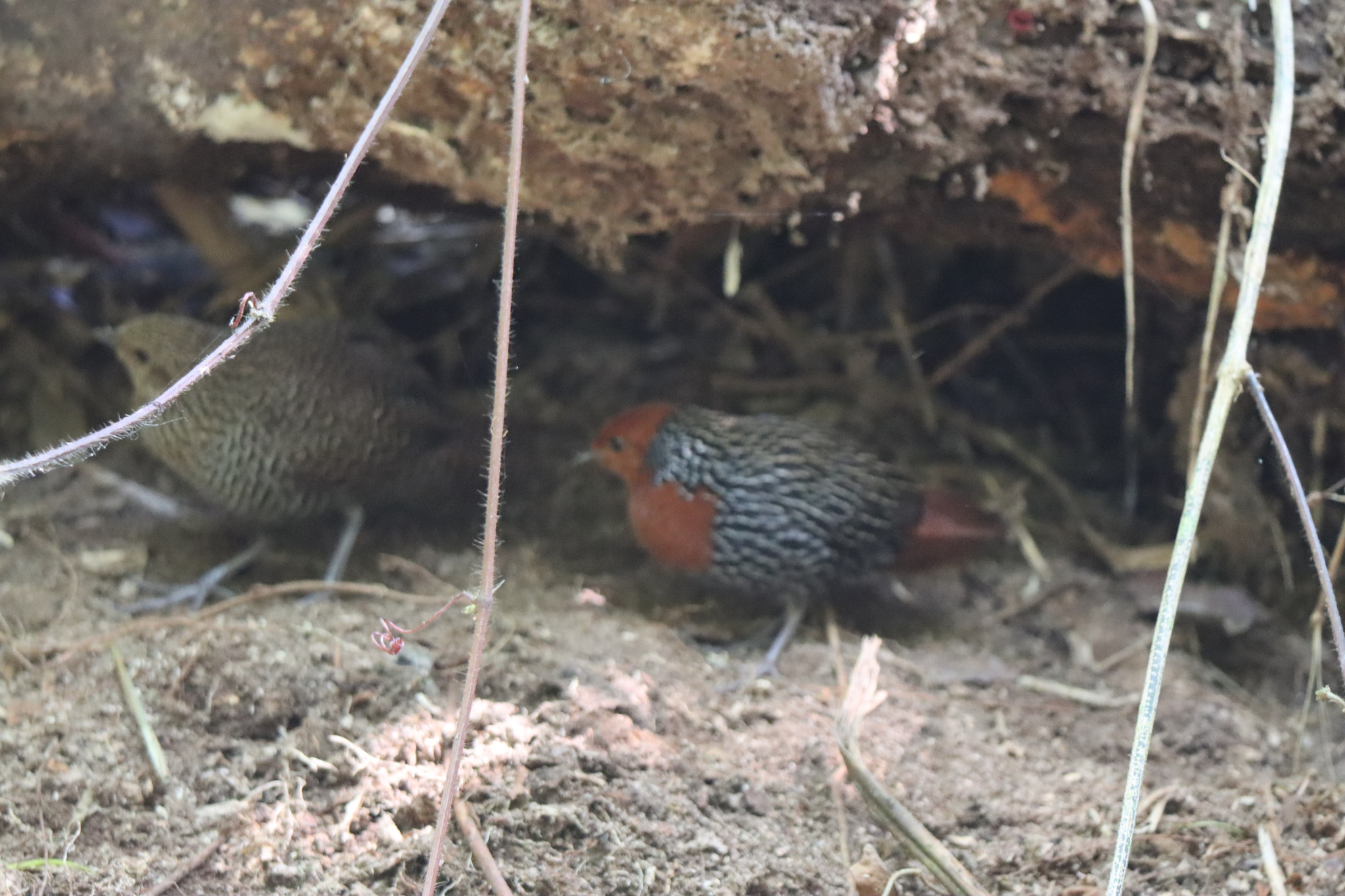

Conservation status
- Least Concern (IUCN 3.1)

Scientific classification
- Kingdom: Animalia
- Phylum: Chordata
- Class: Aves
- Order: Gruiformes
- Family: Sarothruridae
- Genus: Sarothrura
- Species: S. insularis

Binomial name
- Sarothrura insularis (Sharpe, 1870)

= Madagascar flufftail =

Species of bird

The Madagascar flufftail (Sarothrura insularis) is a species of bird in the family Sarothruridae. It is endemic to Madagascar. The subspecies is Monotypic.

Madagascar flufftails are found in Madagascar however, they are limited in the wet areas in the north and lacking from Lake Sahaka in the northeast.

Its natural habitat is subtropical, tropical moist lowland forests, shrubland, grassland, and artificial areas. This is where they find their food which consists of insects and seeds.

Madagascar Flufftails have a stable population of around 6,700-67,000. The species does not meet the criteria for vulnerability, therefore, it is marked as Least Concern.

== Characteristics ==
The Madagascar flufftail is small in size with a length of around 14cm and a weight of 30g.

The head, neck, and breast of the adult male are chestnut rufous while the side of the head, the chin, and the throat are paler. Their back and stomach are black with stripes of white/yellow. The immature male is similar to the adult male except has a more dull color.

The females have a dull color. They have dark upper parts with chestnut streaks. The upper tail is barred cinnamon-buff and the longest upper tail is deep chestnut with a hint of black. The immature female is similar to the adult except for spotting on the underparts and duller color.

== Sounds ==
The Madagascar flufftail's call does not differ by sex. The most common call is a high-pitched, loud, "kee" or "keekee" sound that lasts around 20 seconds. A less common call includes a "drr-drr" and ends with a "kik".

In copulation, the mates give each other an "ii…ii…ii" sound.

While nesting the male gives the female a "tee-chh, tee-chh" and she responds with "chh-chh"

== Reproduction ==
The Madagascar Flufftail engages in its nesting activities at different times of the year depending on the geographical region. In the northeastern (NE) part of its habitat, nesting typically takes place in February, coinciding with the local wet season from November to April. Conversely, in the southern part of Madagascar, nesting is observed in October, aligning with the local wet season there. There is also a likelihood of nesting occurring in September and possibly even in July.

This avian species is known for its distinctive nesting behavior. Unlike many, the Madagascar Flufftail opts to create a unique domed nest. These nests can be found on the ground, or elevated at heights of up to 160 centimeters above the ground.

== Habitat ==
This species is known for its capacity to live in different habitats. It has a preference for grasslands, frequently inhabiting the edges and clearings of both undisturbed and degraded forest areas. Additionally, it readily adapts to secondary bush environments, characterized by the presence of large ferns and thick grasses. Although not documented in cassava fields, it has been observed in regions of intense cultivation. Moreover, this species can be encountered on the forest floor, highlighting its adaptability to various forest ecosystems. It is also known to flourish in marsh environments, often coexisting with tall grasses, reeds, sedges, and occasionally even rice paddies. Its habitat range spans from sea level to elevations as high as 2300 meters."
