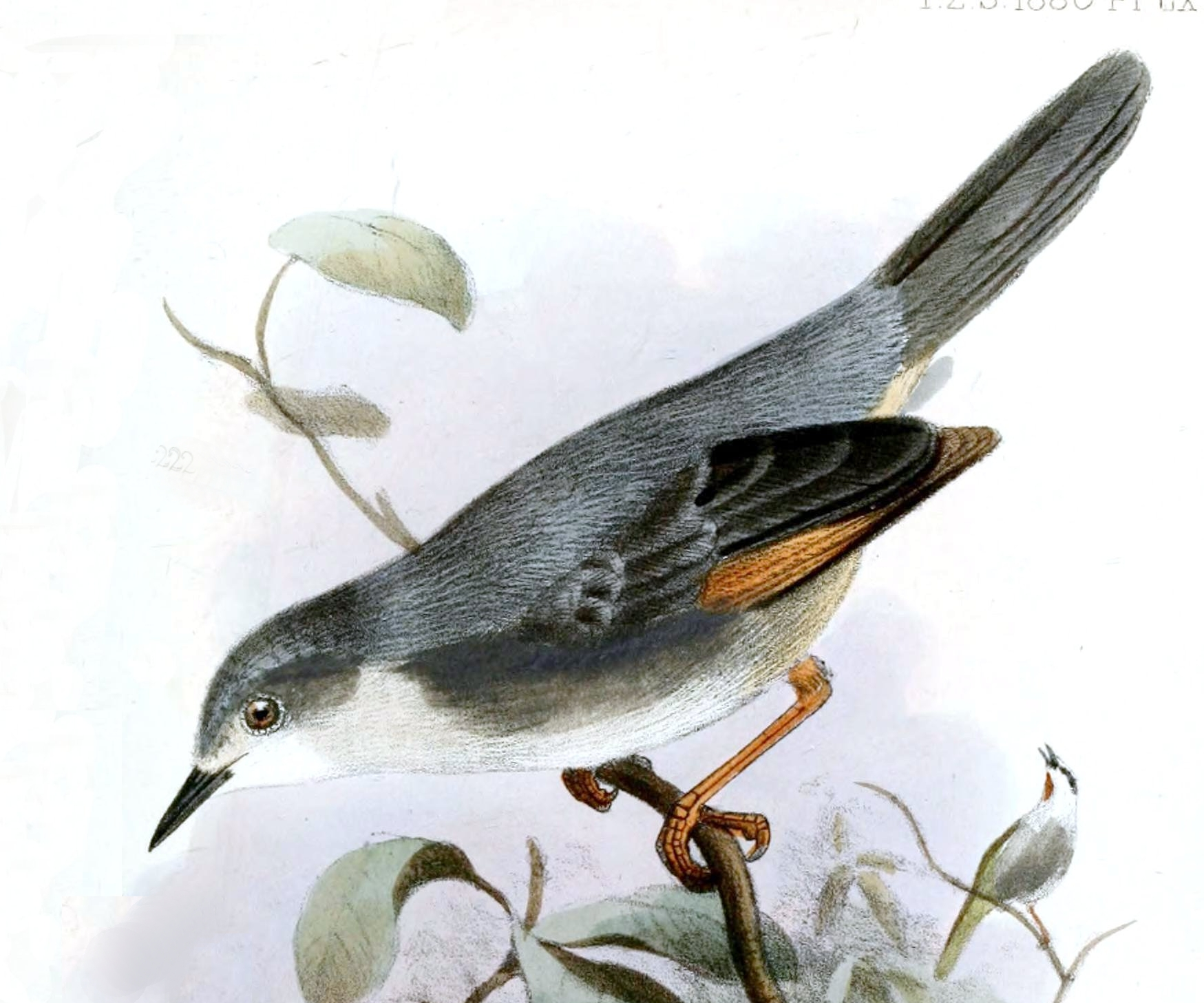
- Illustration by Joseph Smit (1880)

Conservation status
- Least Concern (IUCN 3.1)

Scientific classification
- Kingdom: Animalia
- Phylum: Chordata
- Class: Aves
- Order: Passeriformes
- Family: Cisticolidae
- Genus: Drymocichla; Hartlaub, 1881
- Species: D. incana

Binomial name
- Drymocichla incana Hartlaub, 1881

= Red-winged grey warbler =

Species of bird

The red-winged grey warbler (Drymocichla incana) is a small to medium size bird in the family Cisticolidae that is native to Central Africa. It is the only species placed in the genus Drymocichla. It is mostly grey with a white underside, a long tail and a prominent red patch on the wing. It is commonly found in swamp and savanna-like environments where it breeds in the rainy season. The sexes are alike.

== Taxonomy ==
The red-winged grey warbler was formally described and illustrated in 1881 by the German ornithologist Gustav Hartlaub based on five specimens collected in northern Uganda by the naturalist Emin Pasha. (Note: Hartlaub gives the location as "Magungo". This is on the eastern side of Lake Albert close to where the White Nile discharges into the lake.) Hartlaub introduced a new genus for the species, Drymocichla, and coined the current binomial name Drymocichla incana. The red-winged grey warbler is placed in the family Cisticolidae and remains the only species in the genus Drymocichla. The species is monotypic: no subspecies are recognised. The genus name combines the Ancient Greek rumos meaning "copse" or "wood" with kikhlē meaning "thrush". The specific epithet incana is from Latin incanus meaning "light grey".

A molecular phylogenetic study published in 2013 found that the red-winged grey warbler is most closely related to the white-chinned prinia in the genus Schistolais.

== Description ==
The red-winged grey warbler is around 13 cm (5.1 in) in length and weighs about 10 g (0.35 oz) making this a small to medium sized bird. It has a light gray back with a white underside. When flying with the wings fanned out, brown and red feathers can be seen. The species have small pink legs and a sharp, short black beak. With white around the eyes and light gray feathers on the forehead, it is known for its distinct long grey tail. The male and female are similar in appearance. They live for around four and a half years.

== Distribution and habitat ==
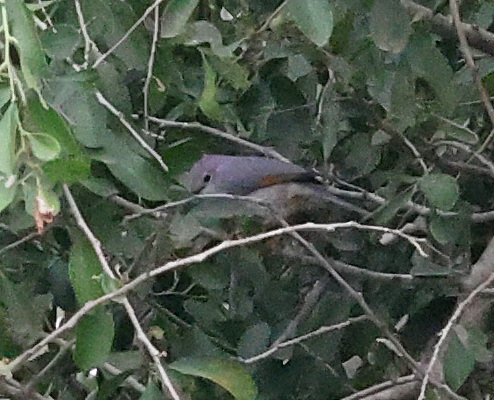
Live bird in Uganda

It is found moist in savannas and swampy tropical regions of Central Africa, particularly Cameroon, Nigeria, and Uganda. This bird often resides in areas with thick vegetation and proximity to water sources.

== Behaviour ==
=== Food and feeding ===
The red-winged grey warbler bird mainly eats insects especially, beetles, spiders, and tiny insect larvae. It catches its prey while flying through the vegetation or hovering mid-air. This method of hunting helps it find and target its prey accurately. Though small, the creature needs this diet to survive and maintain its ecosystem's balance.

=== Breeding ===
Breeding takes place during the rainy season, spanning from spring (around May) to fall (October). To signify their partnership, they often sing in unison. The fledglings have a reddish wing patch, reddish belly, and a yellowish base on their bill.

== Threats and conservation status ==
This species boasts a vast and varied geographic range, and according to the criteria for evaluating vulnerability, it does not meet the threshold for concern. While its extent of occurrence spans less than 20,000 km^{2}, these birds do not exhibit any other indicators of vulnerability, such as shrinking or irregular range size, insufficient or inadequate habitat quality. The red-winged grey warbler is not globally threatened. These birds are difficult to find and not commonly found or seen. There have been very few observations of this bird in national parks in Africa, especially in the western regions.
