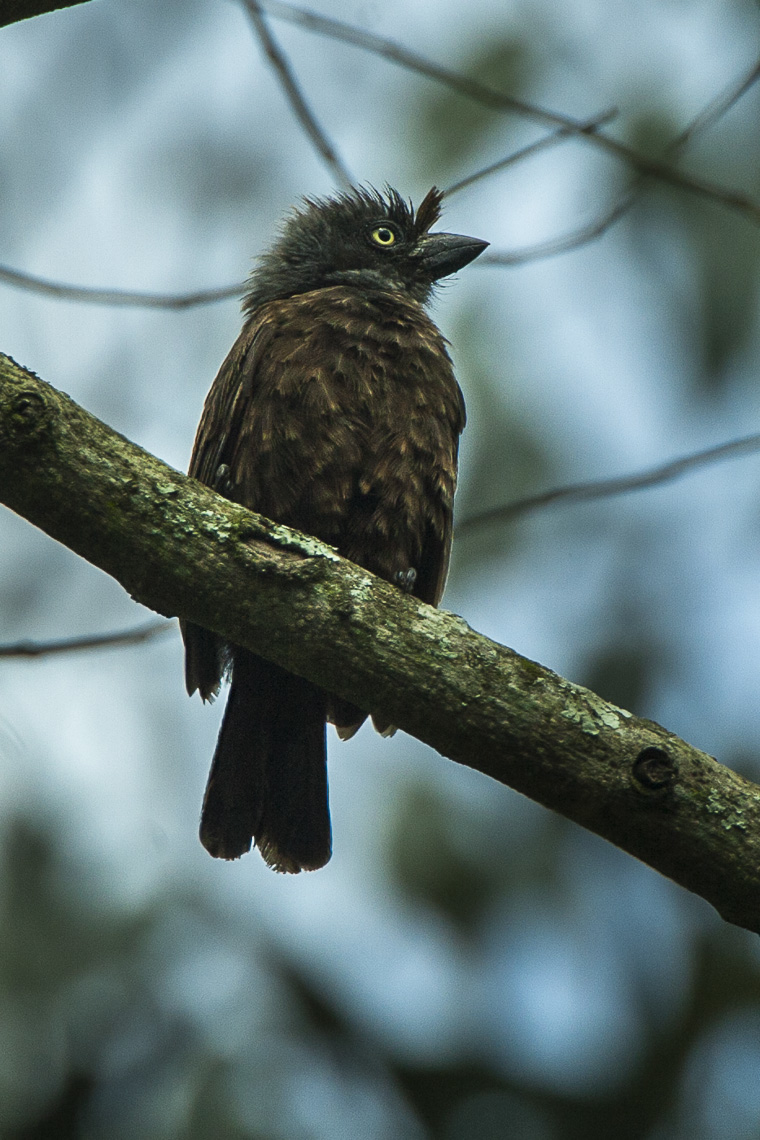

Conservation status
- Least Concern (IUCN 3.1)

Scientific classification
- Kingdom: Animalia
- Phylum: Chordata
- Class: Aves
- Order: Piciformes
- Family: Lybiidae
- Genus: Gymnobucco
- Species: G. bonapartei

Binomial name
- Gymnobucco bonapartei Hartlaub, 1854

Subspecies
- G. b. bonapartei - Hartlaub, 1854; G. b. cinereiceps - Sharpe, 1891

= Grey-throated barbet =

Species of bird

The grey-throated barbet (Gymnobucco bonapartei) is a species of bird in the Lybiidae family (African barbets). It is found in Angola, Cameroon, Central African Republic, Republic of the Congo, Democratic Republic of the Congo, Equatorial Guinea, Gabon, Kenya, Rwanda, South Sudan, Tanzania, and Uganda.

== Description ==
The Grey-throated Barbet is a dark, robust bird with a distinctive tuft of feathers on its forehead. Its eye color varies across its range, appearing pale in the eastern regions and dark in the west. This species is commonly observed in small groups, often around dead trees in humid forests and areas of secondary growth. It can be distinguished from the Naked-faced and Bristle-nosed Barbets by its mostly feathered head and dark bill. While Sladen's Barbet also has a dark bill, the Gray-throated Barbet is set apart by its feathered head.

Its vocalizations include nasal "squeaky toy" calls, sharp "peet" notes, and a dry rattle.

== Diet ==
It eats a diverse group of fruits, including Allophyllus, figs, and Musanga.
