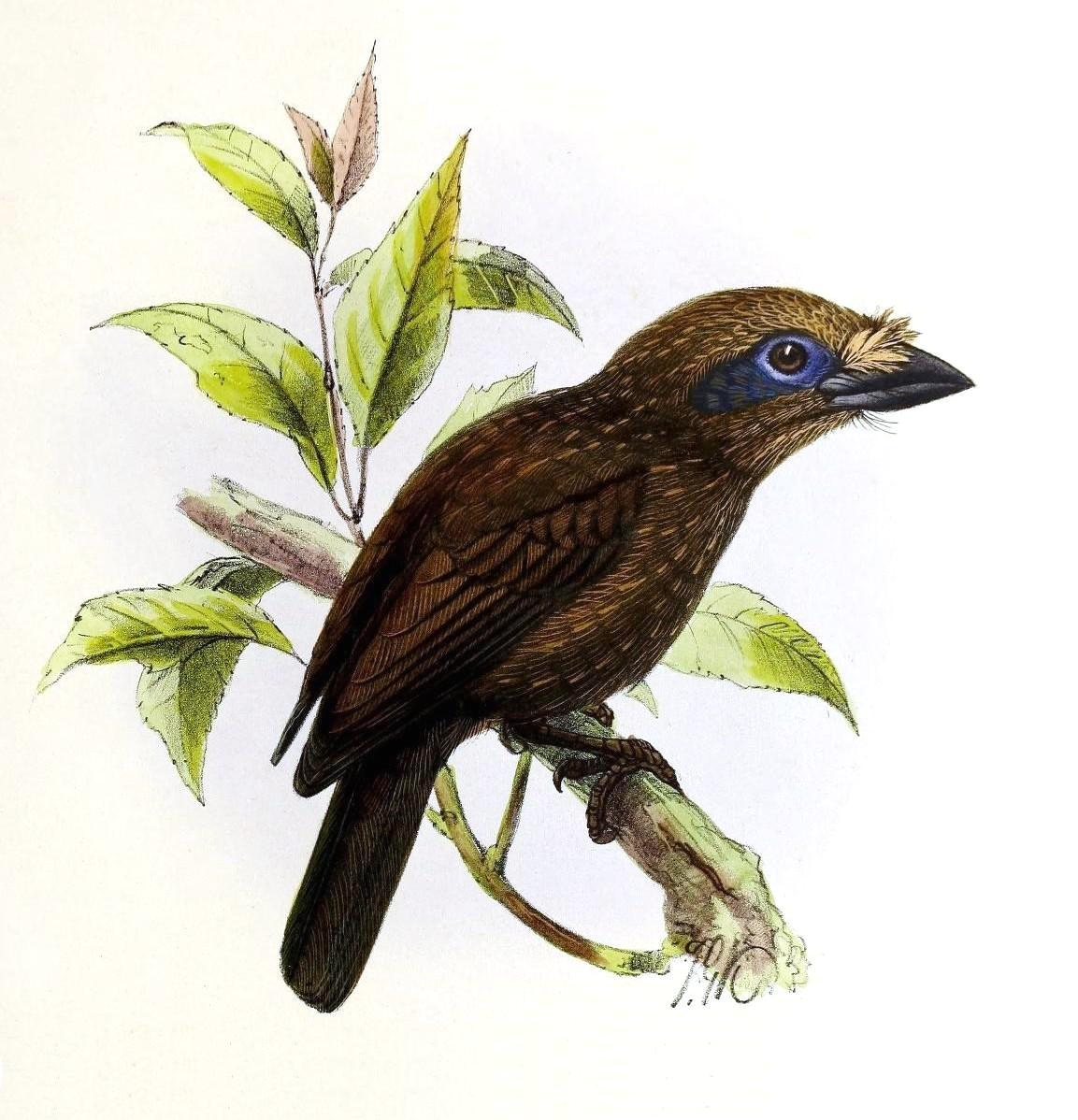
- G. bonapartei by J.G. Keulemans

Scientific classification
- Kingdom: Animalia
- Phylum: Chordata
- Class: Aves
- Order: Piciformes
- Family: Lybiidae
- Genus: Gymnobucco; Bonaparte, 1850

Species
- Gymnobucco bonapartei Gymnobucco calvus Gymnobucco peli Gymnobucco sladeni

= Gymnobucco =

Genus of birds

Gymnobucco is a bird genus in the African barbet family (Lybiidae), which was formerly included in the Capitonidae and sometimes in the Ramphastidae (toucans).

It contains the following species:

Image	Scientific name	Common name	Distribution
	Gymnobucco calvus	Naked-faced barbet	Angola, Cameroon, Republic of the Congo, Democratic Republic of the Congo, Ivory Coast, Equatorial Guinea, Gabon, Ghana, Liberia, Nigeria, Sierra Leone, and Togo.
	Gymnobucco peli	Bristle-nosed barbet	Central African Republic and the Democratic Republic of the Congo.
	Gymnobucco sladeni	Sladen's barbet	Angola, Cameroon, Central African Republic, Republic of the Congo, Democratic Republic of the Congo, Equatorial Guinea, Gabon, Kenya, Rwanda, South Sudan, Tanzania, and Uganda.
	Gymnobucco bonapartei	Grey-throated barbet	Angola, Benin, Cameroon, Republic of the Congo, Democratic Republic of the Congo, Ivory Coast, Equatorial Guinea, Gabon, Ghana, Guinea, Liberia, Nigeria, Sierra Leone, and Togo
