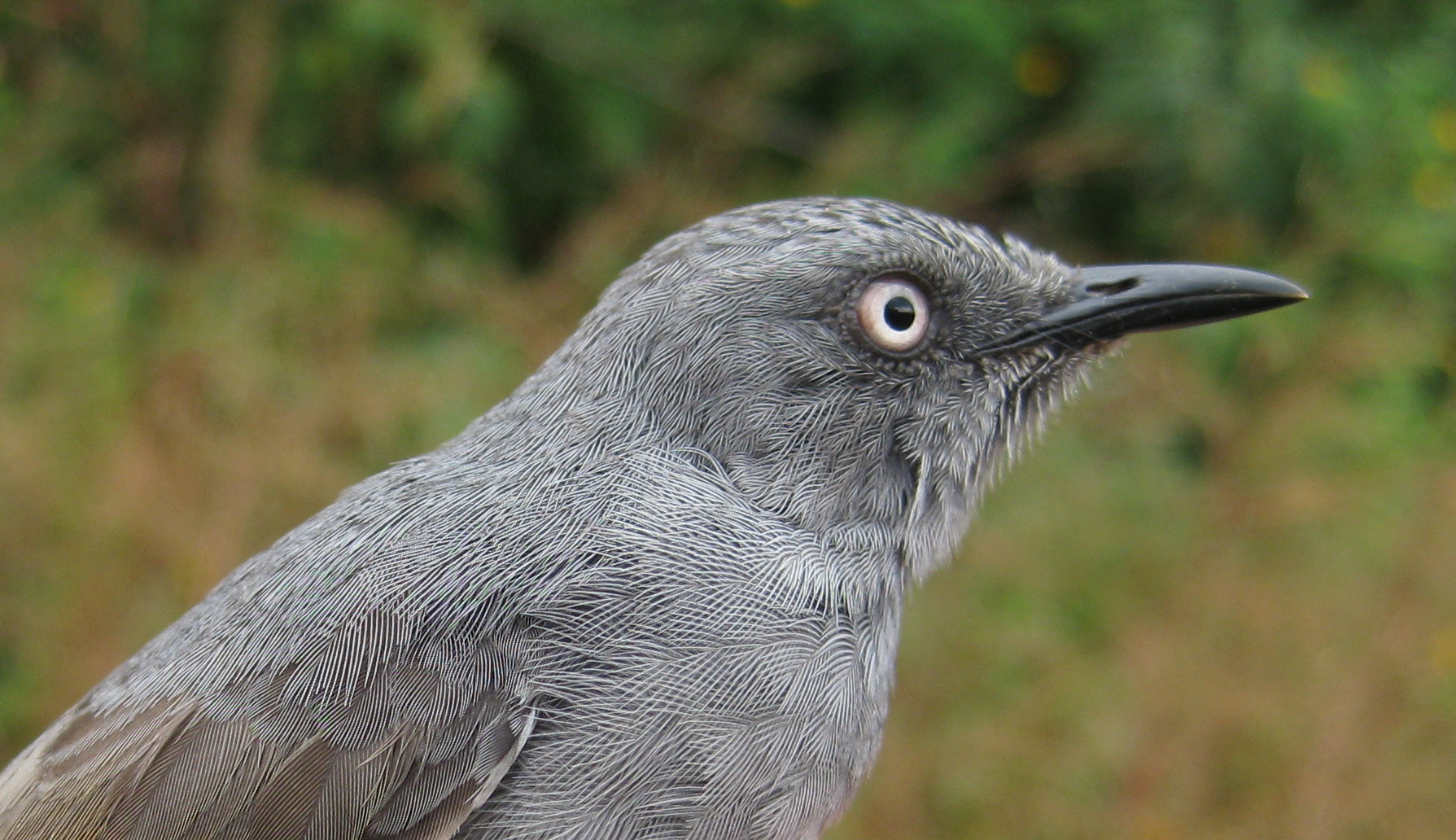
- At Mt Nimba, Liberia

Conservation status
- Endangered (IUCN 3.1)

Scientific classification
- Kingdom: Animalia
- Phylum: Chordata
- Class: Aves
- Order: Passeriformes
- Family: Cisticolidae
- Genus: Schistolais
- Species: S. leontica

Binomial name
- Schistolais leontica (Bates, 1930)

Synonyms
- Prinia leontica

= Sierra Leone prinia =

Species of bird

The Sierra Leone prinia (Schistolais leontica), also known as the white-eyed prinia, is a species of bird in the family Cisticolidae. It is found in Ivory Coast, Guinea, Liberia, and Sierra Leone. Its natural habitat is thickets and forest edge, especially in the transition zone between submontane forest and submontane grassland. It is threatened by habitat loss, especially habitat clearance to establish iron ore mines.
