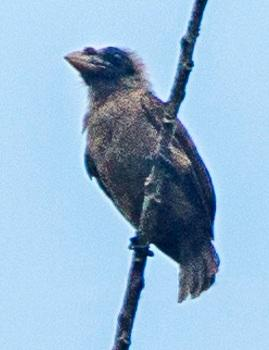
- G. peli in Ghana

Conservation status
- Least Concern (IUCN 3.1)

Scientific classification
- Kingdom: Animalia
- Phylum: Chordata
- Class: Aves
- Order: Piciformes
- Family: Lybiidae
- Genus: Gymnobucco
- Species: G. peli

Binomial name
- Gymnobucco peli Hartlaub, 1857

= Bristle-nosed barbet =

Species of bird

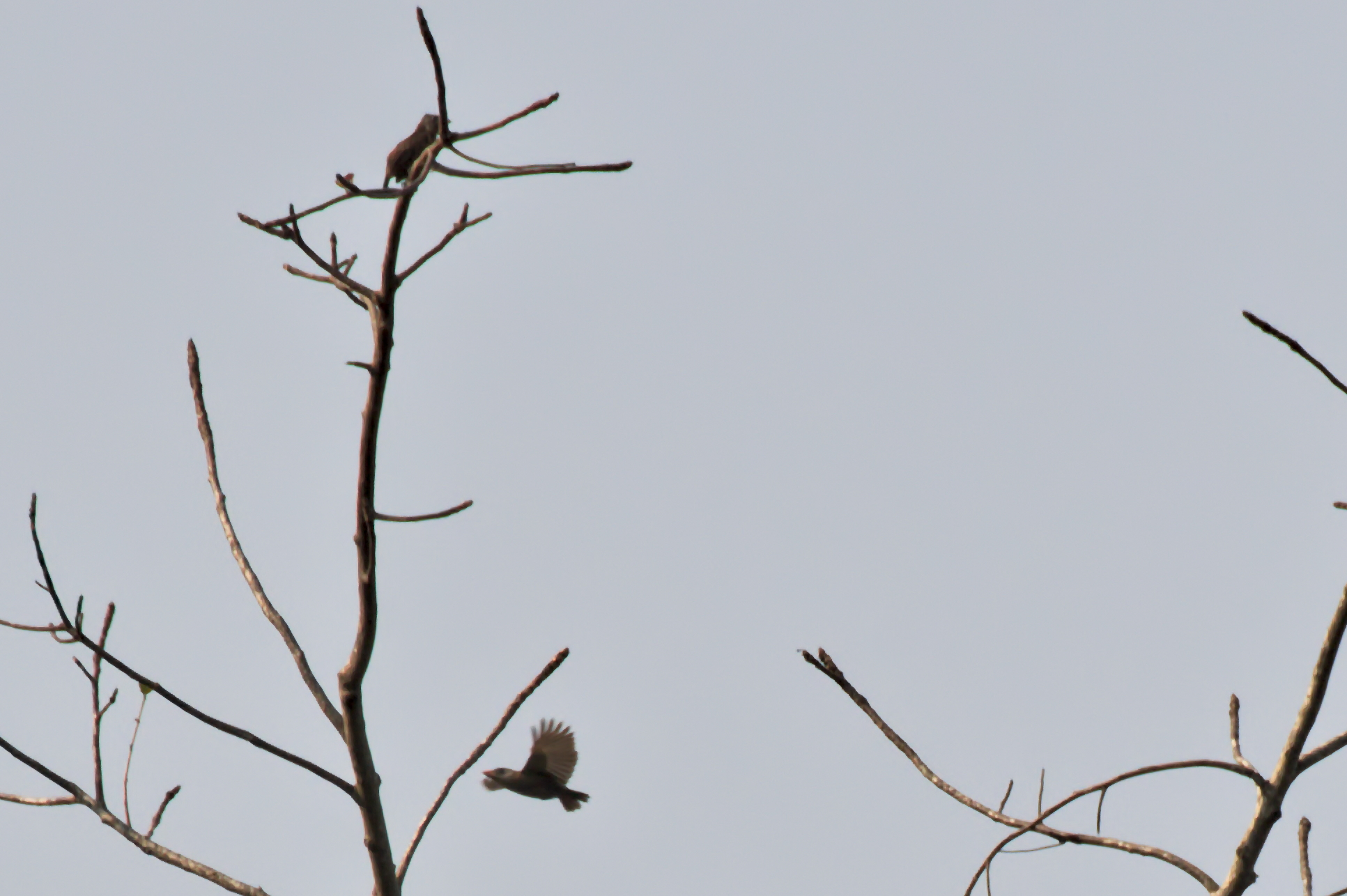
2 Bristle-nosed Barbets, one flying

The bristle-nosed barbet (Gymnobucco peli) is a bird species in the family Lybiidae. It used to be placed in the family Bucconidae (puffbirds), which has been split up; alternatively, it may be included in a vastly expanded Ramphastidae (toucans).

Its range covers areas near the Gulf of Guinea (on either side of the Dahomey Gap), from eastern Sierra Leone to far northwestern Angola.

== Description ==
The Bristle-nosed barbet is a dark, stocky bird characterized by a prominent buff tuft of feathers on its forehead. It is typically found in small groups, frequenting dead trees in rainforests, secondary growth, and plantations, often alongside Naked-faced or Grey-throated Barbets. It closely resembles the Naked-faced Barbet but can be distinguished by the prominent tuft above its bill. Additionally, while similar to the Gray-throated Barbet, it is set apart by its mostly unfeathered head and pale bill.

Its vocalizations include nasal "squeaky toy" calls, a dry rattle, and a series of uniform hollow hoots.

== Ecology ==
The Bristle-nosed Barbet remains poorly studied in terms of its lifestyle and behavior. It forages in the foliage of fruit-bearing trees, often hanging upside down from branches in a manner reminiscent of a tit. Its diet primarily consists of fruit and nectar, with insects likely included as well.

This species nests and roosts in tree hollows, typically in proximity to Naked-faced and Sladen's barbets. Notably, no nesting sites of the Bristle-nosed Barbet have been found without nearby nests of these two species, although it constructs its own tree cavities. In Gabon, its breeding season spans from October to April, while in the drier regions of Cameroon, it extends over a longer period. In Ghana, breeding activity has been observed in November and December. Beyond these observations, little is known about the species' breeding biology.
