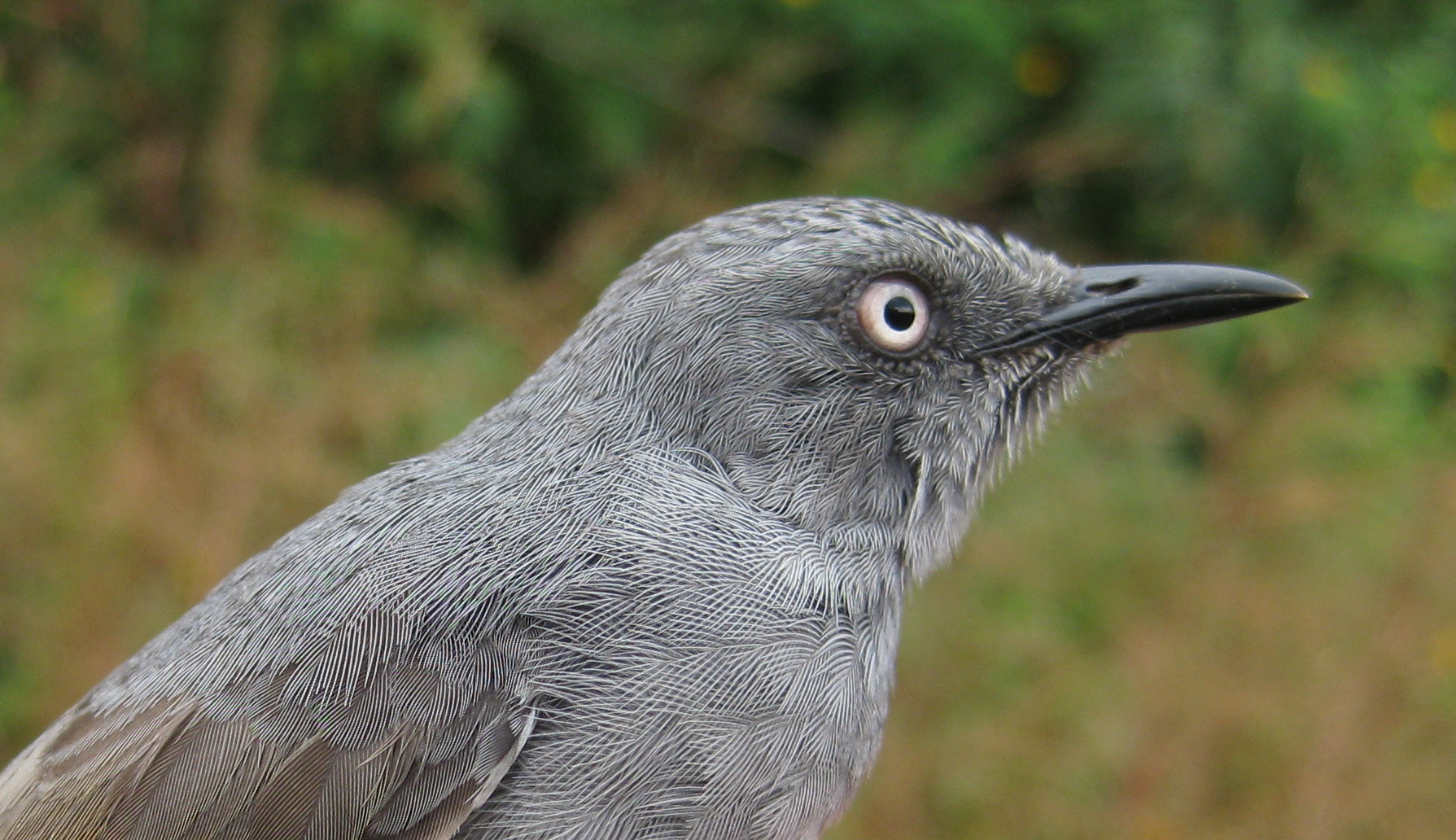
- Sierra Leone prinia (Schistolais leontica)

Scientific classification
- Kingdom: Animalia
- Phylum: Chordata
- Class: Aves
- Order: Passeriformes
- Family: Cisticolidae
- Genus: Schistolais; Wolters, 1980

Type species
- Drymoeca leucopogon Cabanis, 1875

Species
- See text

= Schistolais =

Genus of birds

Schistolais is a genus of passerine birds in the family Cisticolidae.

It contains the following species:

Image	Scientific name	Common name	Distribution
	Schistolais leucopogon	White-chinned prinia	Angola, Burundi, Cameroon, Central African Republic, Republic of the Congo, Democratic Republic of the Congo, Equatorial Guinea, Gabon, Kenya, Nigeria, Rwanda, South Sudan, Tanzania, Uganda, and Zambia.
	Schistolais leontica	Sierra Leone prinia	Ivory Coast, Guinea, Liberia, and Sierra Leone.
