= Sladen's barbet =

Conservation status
- Least Concern (IUCN 3.1)

Scientific classification
- Kingdom: Animalia
- Phylum: Chordata
- Class: Aves
- Order: Piciformes
- Family: Lybiidae
- Genus: Gymnobucco
- Species: G. sladeni

Binomial name
- Gymnobucco sladeni Ogilvie-Grant, 1907

Species of bird

Sladen's barbet (Gymnobucco sladeni) is a species of bird in the Lybiidae family (African barbets). It is found in the Central African Republic and the Democratic Republic of the Congo.

Its common name and Latin binomial commemorate the British collector Major A. G. Sladen.

The Sladen's Barbet is a dark, stocky bird characterized by a distinctive tuft of buff-colored feathers on its forehead. It is typically observed in small groups, frequenting dead trees in lowland rainforests, gallery forests, and secondary growth areas. This species occasionally coexists with the Grey-throated Barbet, and while both species possess dark bills, the unfeathered head of Sladen's Barbet serves as a key identifying feature.

Its vocal repertoire includes nasal, "squeaky toy"-like calls and dry, agitated rattles.
