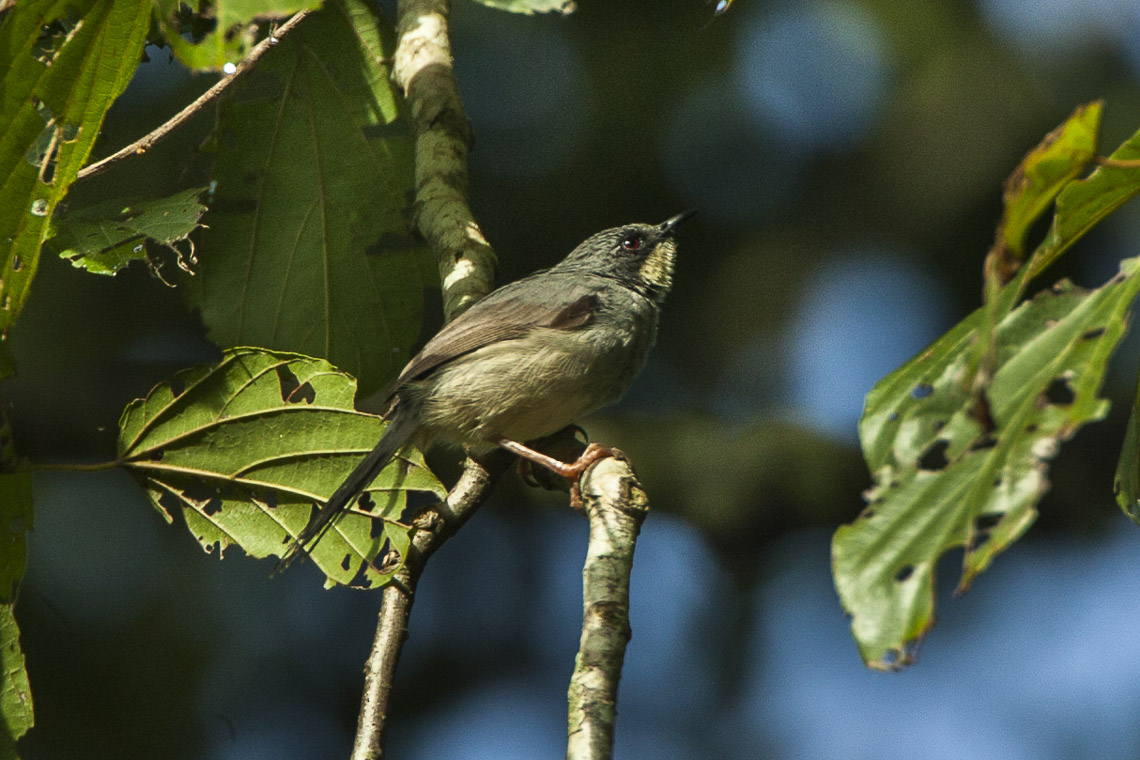
- At Kakamega, Kenya

Conservation status
- Least Concern (IUCN 3.1)

Scientific classification
- Kingdom: Animalia
- Phylum: Chordata
- Class: Aves
- Order: Passeriformes
- Family: Cisticolidae
- Genus: Schistolais
- Species: S. leucopogon

Binomial name
- Schistolais leucopogon (Cabanis, 1875)

Subspecies
- S. l. leucopogon; S. l. reichenowi

= White-chinned prinia =

Species of bird

The white-chinned prinia (Schistolais leucopogon), also known as the white-chinned warbler, is a species of bird in the family Cisticolidae.

The white-chinned prinia was described by the German ornithologist Jean Cabanis in 1875 and given the binomial name Drymoeca leucopogon. The specific epithet leucopogon is from the Ancient Greek leukos for "white" and pōgōn, "beard".

== Distribution and habitat ==
It is found in the African countries of Angola, Burundi, Cameroon, Central African Republic, Republic of the Congo, Democratic Republic of the Congo, Equatorial Guinea, Gabon, Kenya, Nigeria, Rwanda, South Sudan, Tanzania, Uganda, and Zambia. Its natural habitats are subtropical or tropical dry forest, subtropical or tropical moist lowland forest, subtropical or tropical moist montane forest, and subtropical or tropical moist shrubland.
