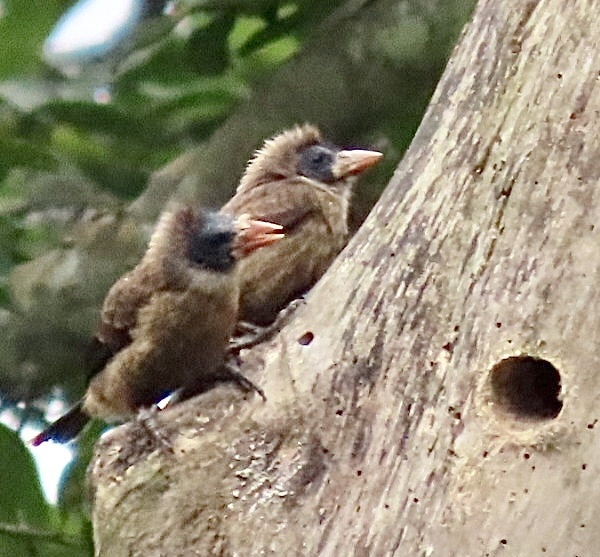

Conservation status
- Least Concern (IUCN 3.1)

Scientific classification
- Kingdom: Animalia
- Phylum: Chordata
- Class: Aves
- Order: Piciformes
- Family: Lybiidae
- Genus: Gymnobucco
- Species: G. calvus

Binomial name
- Gymnobucco calvus (Lafresnaye, 1841)

Subspecies
- Gymnobucco calvus calvus - (Lafresnaye, 1841); Gymnobucco calvus congicus - Chapin, 1932; Gymnobucco calvus vernayi - Boulton, 1931

= Naked-faced barbet =

Species of bird

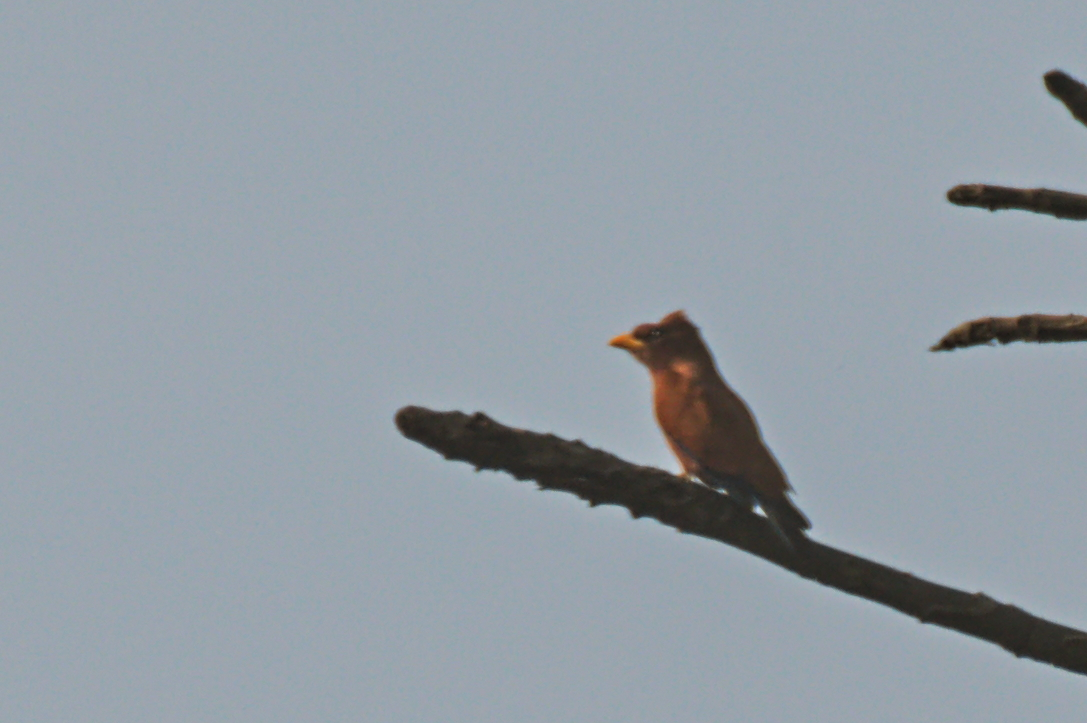
Naked-faced barbet

The naked-faced barbet (Gymnobucco calvus) is a bird species in the family Lybiidae (the African barbets). It used to be placed in the family Bucconidae (puffbirds), which has been split up; alternatively, it may be included in a vastly expanded Ramphastidae (toucans).

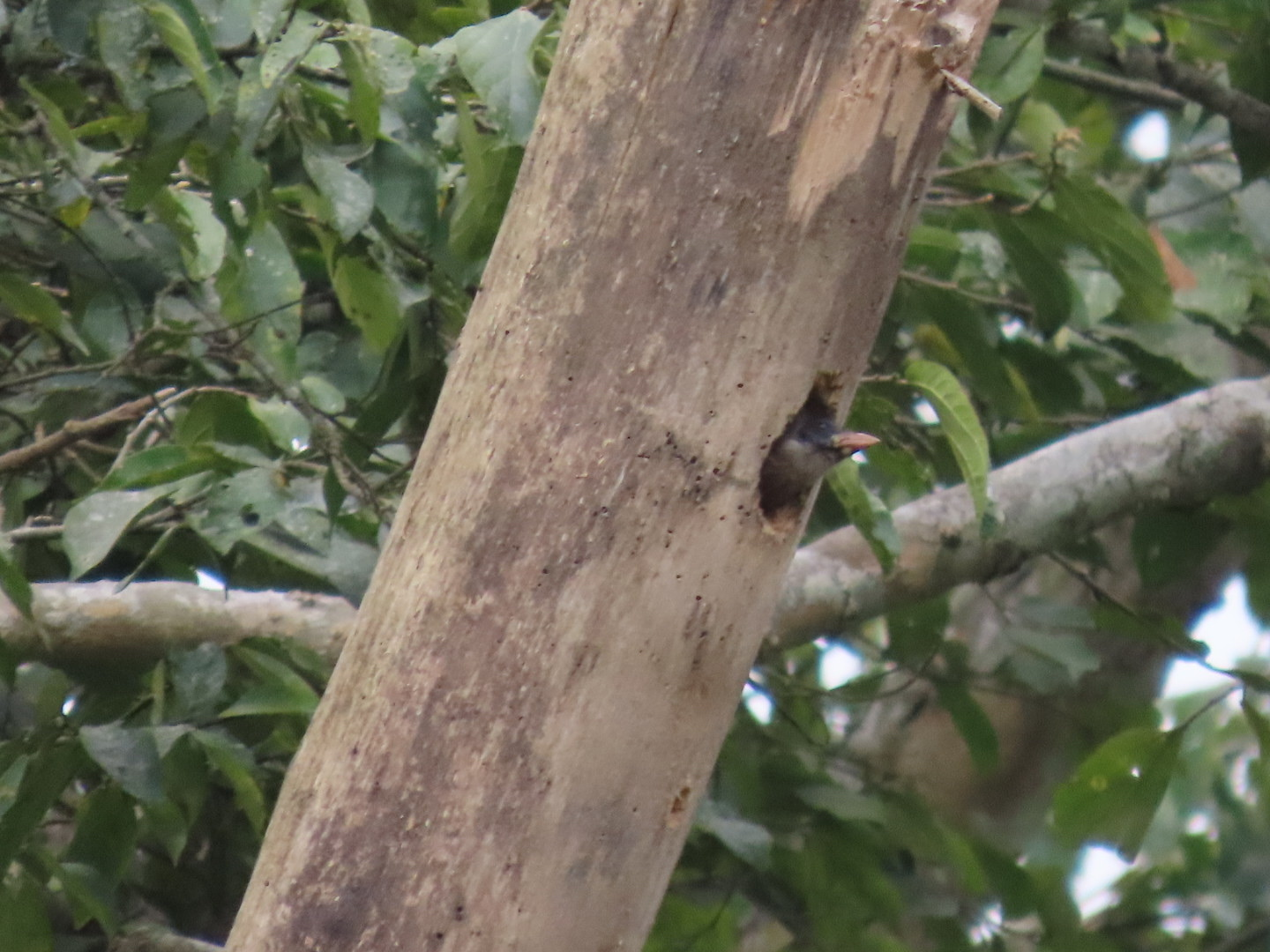
In nesting cavity

It is found in Angola, Benin, Cameroon, Republic of the Congo, DRC, Ivory Coast, Equatorial Guinea, Gabon, Ghana, Guinea, Liberia, Nigeria, Sierra Leone, and Togo.
