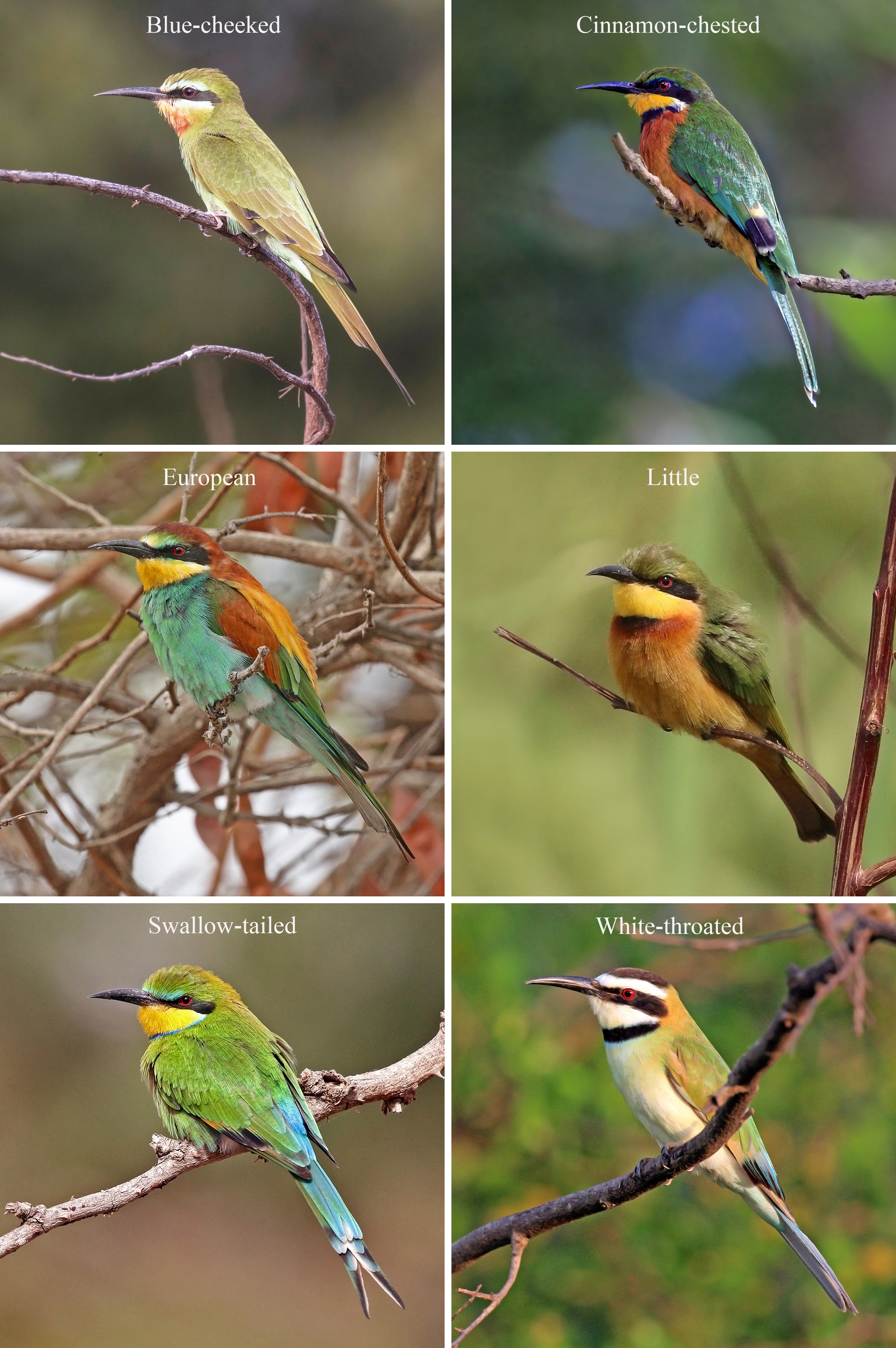
- Six common African bee-eaters

Scientific classification
- Kingdom: Animalia
- Phylum: Chordata
- Class: Aves
- Order: Coraciiformes
- Family: Meropidae; Rafinesque, 1815

Genera
- Nyctyornis; Meropogon; Merops
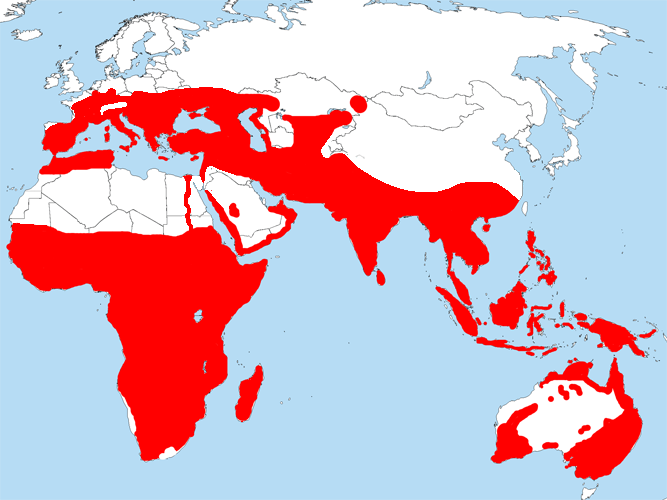
- Approximate area in which bee-eater species regularly breed

= Bee-eater =

Insectivorous bird species in the family Meropidae

The bee-eaters are a group of birds in the family Meropidae, containing three genera and thirty-one species. Most species are found in Africa and Asia, with a few in southern Europe, Australia, and New Guinea. They are characterised by richly coloured plumage, slender bodies, and usually elongated central tail feathers. All have long down-turned bills and medium to long wings, which may be pointed or round. Male and female plumages are usually similar.

As their name suggests, bee-eaters predominantly eat flying insects, especially bees and wasps, which are caught on the wing from an open perch. The insect's stinger is removed by repeatedly hitting and rubbing the insect on a hard surface. During this process, pressure is applied to the insect's body, thereby discharging most of the venom.

Most bee-eaters are gregarious. They form colonies, nesting in burrows tunnelled into vertical sandy banks, often at the side of a river or in flat ground. As they mostly live in colonies, large numbers of nest holes may be seen together. The eggs are white, with typically five to the clutch. Most species are monogamous, and both parents care for their young, sometimes with assistance from related birds in the colony.

Bee-eaters may be killed by raptors; their nests are raided by rodents, weasels, martens and snakes, and they can carry various parasites. Some species are adversely affected by human activity or habitat loss, but none meet the International Union for Conservation of Nature's vulnerability criteria, and all are therefore evaluated as "least concern". Their conspicuous appearance means that they have been mentioned by ancient writers and incorporated into mythology.

== Taxonomy ==
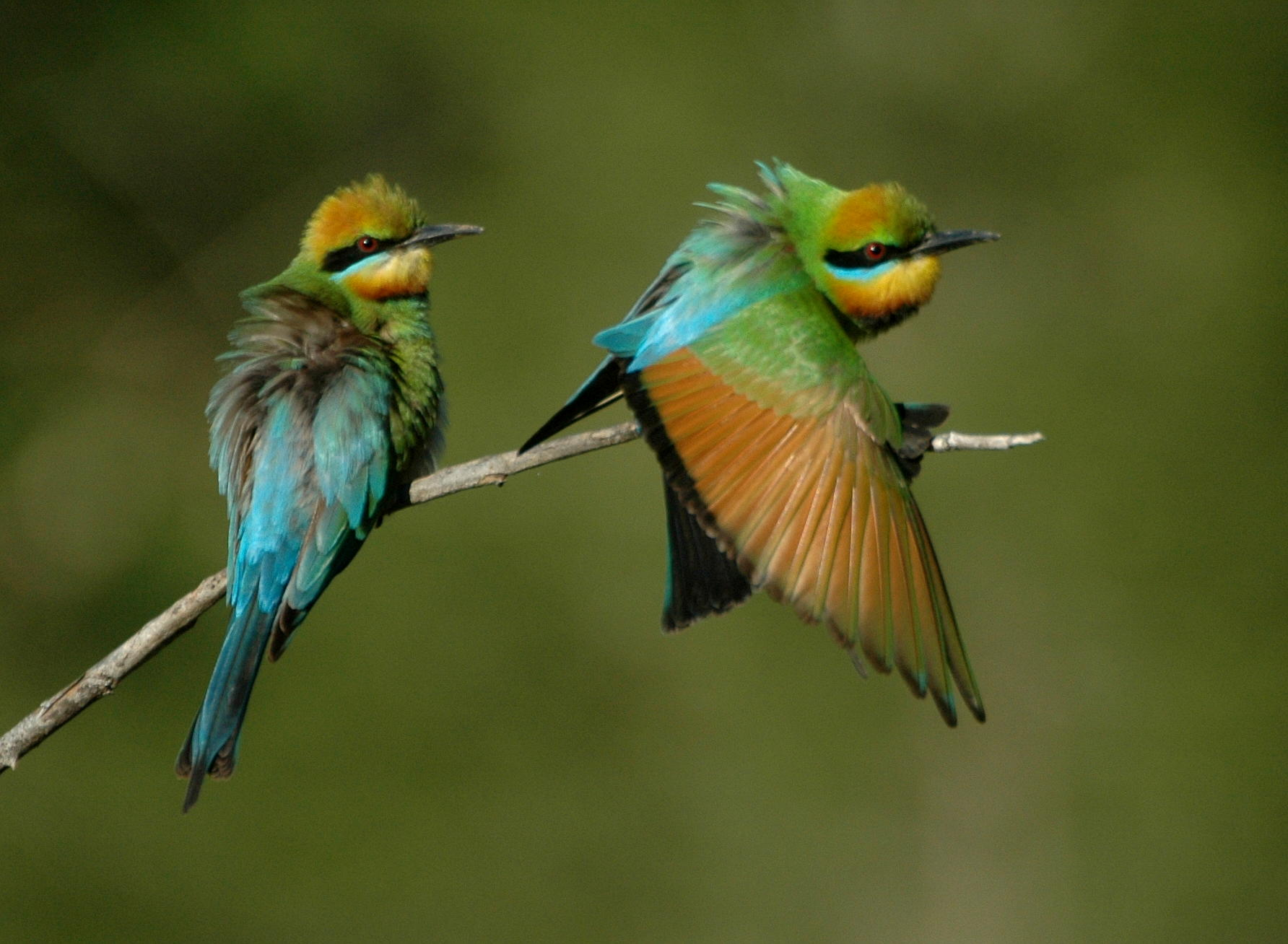
Rainbow bee-eaters, a Merops species

The bee-eaters were first named as a scientific group by the French polymath Constantine Samuel Rafinesque-Schmaltz, who created the bird subfamily Meropia for these birds in 1815. The name, now modernised as Meropidae, is derived from Merops, the Ancient Greek for "bee-eater", and the English term "bee-eater" was first recorded in 1668, referring to the European species.

The bee-eaters have been considered to be related to other families, such as the rollers, hoopoes and kingfishers, but ancestors of those families diverged from the bee-eaters at least forty million years ago, so any relationship is not close. The scarcity of fossils is unhelpful. Bee-eater fossils from the Pleistocene (2,588,000 to 11,700 years ago) have been found in Austria, and there are Holocene (from 11,700 years ago to present) specimens from Israel and Russia, but all have proved to be of the extant European bee-eater. Opinions have varied as to the bee-eater's nearest relatives. In 2001, Fry considered the kingfishers to be the most likely, whereas a large study published in 2008 found that bee-eaters are sister to all other Coraciiformes (rollers, ground rollers, todies, motmots and kingfishers). A 2009 book supported Fry's contention, but then a later study in 2015 suggested that the bee-eaters are sister to the rollers. The 2008 and 2015 papers both linked the kingfishers to the New World motmots.

More recent molecular phylogenetic studies have confirmed that the bee-eaters are more closely related to the rollers and ground rollers than they are to the todies, motmots and kingfishers. The relationship between the families is shown in the cladogram below. The number of species in each family is taken from the list maintained by Frank Gill, Pamela C. Rasmussen and David Donsker on behalf of the International Ornithological Committee (IOC).

- Coraciiformes
  - - Meropidae – bee-eaters (31 species)
    - - Brachypteraciidae – ground rollers (5 species)
      - Coraciidae – rollers (13 species)
  - - Todidae – todies (5 species)
    - - Momotidae – motmots (14 species)
      - Alcedinidae – kingfishers (118 species)

The bee-eaters are generally similar in appearance, although they are normally divided into three genera. Nyctyornis comprises two large species with long throat feathers, the blue-bearded bee-eater and the red-bearded bee-eater, both of which have rounded wings, a ridged culmen, feathered nostrils and a relatively sluggish lifestyle. The purple-bearded bee-eater is the sole member of Meropogon, which is intermediate between Nyctyornis and the typical bee-eaters, having rounded wings and a "beard", but a smooth culmen and no nostril feathers. All the remaining species are normally retained in the single genus Merops. There are close relationships within this genus, for example the red-throated bee-eater and the white-fronted bee-eater form a superspecies, but formerly suggested genera, such as Aerops, Melittophagus, Bombylonax and Dicrocercus, have not been generally accepted for several decades since a 1969 paper united them in the current arrangement.

=== Species in taxonomic order ===
Evolutionary relationships

- Nyctyornis
- - - Merops bullockoides
    - M. bulocki
  - - - Meropogon forsteni
      - Merops breweri
    - - - M. gularis
        - M. muelleri
      - - M. hirundineus
        - - M. oreobates
          - - M. pusillus
            - M. variegatus
    - - - - M. boehmi
        - - M. albicollis
          - - M. nubicus
            - - M. malimbicus
              - - - M. orientalis
                  - - M. leschenaulti
                    - M. viridis
                - - M. philippinus
                  - - - M. apiaster
                      - M. ornatus
                    - - M. persicus
                      - M. superciliosus

Phylogenetic tree (maximum parsimony) based on a 2007 study. Nyctyornis athertoni and Merops revoilii were not included in the study. The placement of Meropogon is unclear.

The bee-eater family contains the following species.

Image	Genus	Living species
	Nyctyornis Jardine & Selby, 1830	Red-bearded bee-eater, Nyctyornis amictus; Blue-bearded bee-eater, Nyctyornis athertoni
	Meropogon Bonaparte, 1850	Purple-bearded bee-eater, Meropogon forsteni
	Merops Linnaeus, 1758	Little bee-eater, Merops pusillus; Blue-cheeked bee-eater, Merops persicus; Asian green bee-eater, Merops orientalis; African green bee-eater, Merops viridissimus; Arabian green bee-eater, Merops cyanophyrs; White-throated bee-eater, Merops albicollis; Swallow-tailed bee-eater, Merops hirundineus; Blue-tailed bee-eater, Merops philippinus; Black bee-eater, Merops gularis; Blue-headed bee-eater, Merops muelleri; Blue-moustached bee-eater, Merops mentalis; Red-throated bee-eater, Merops bulocki; White-fronted bee-eater, Merops bullockoides; Blue-breasted bee-eater, Merops variegatus; Ethiopian bee-eater, Merops lafresnayii; Cinnamon-chested bee-eater, Merops oreobates; Black-headed bee-eater, Merops breweri; Somali bee-eater, Merops revoilii; Böhm's bee-eater, Merops boehmi; Blue-throated bee-eater, Merops viridis; Rufous-crowned bee-eater, Merops americanus; Olive bee-eater, Merops superciliosus; Rainbow bee-eater, Merops ornatus; European bee-eater, Merops apiaster; Chestnut-headed bee-eater, Merops leschenaulti; Rosy bee-eater, Merops malimbicus; Northern carmine bee-eater, Merops nubicus; Southern carmine bee-eater, Merops nubicoides

The Asian green bee-eater, African green bee-eater, and Arabian green bee-eater were previously considered to be a single species, and are still treated as such by some authorities.

A 2007 nuclear and mitochondrial DNA study produced a possible phylogenetic tree, although the position of the purple-bearded bee-eater seems anomalous, in that it appears amongst Merops species.

== Description ==
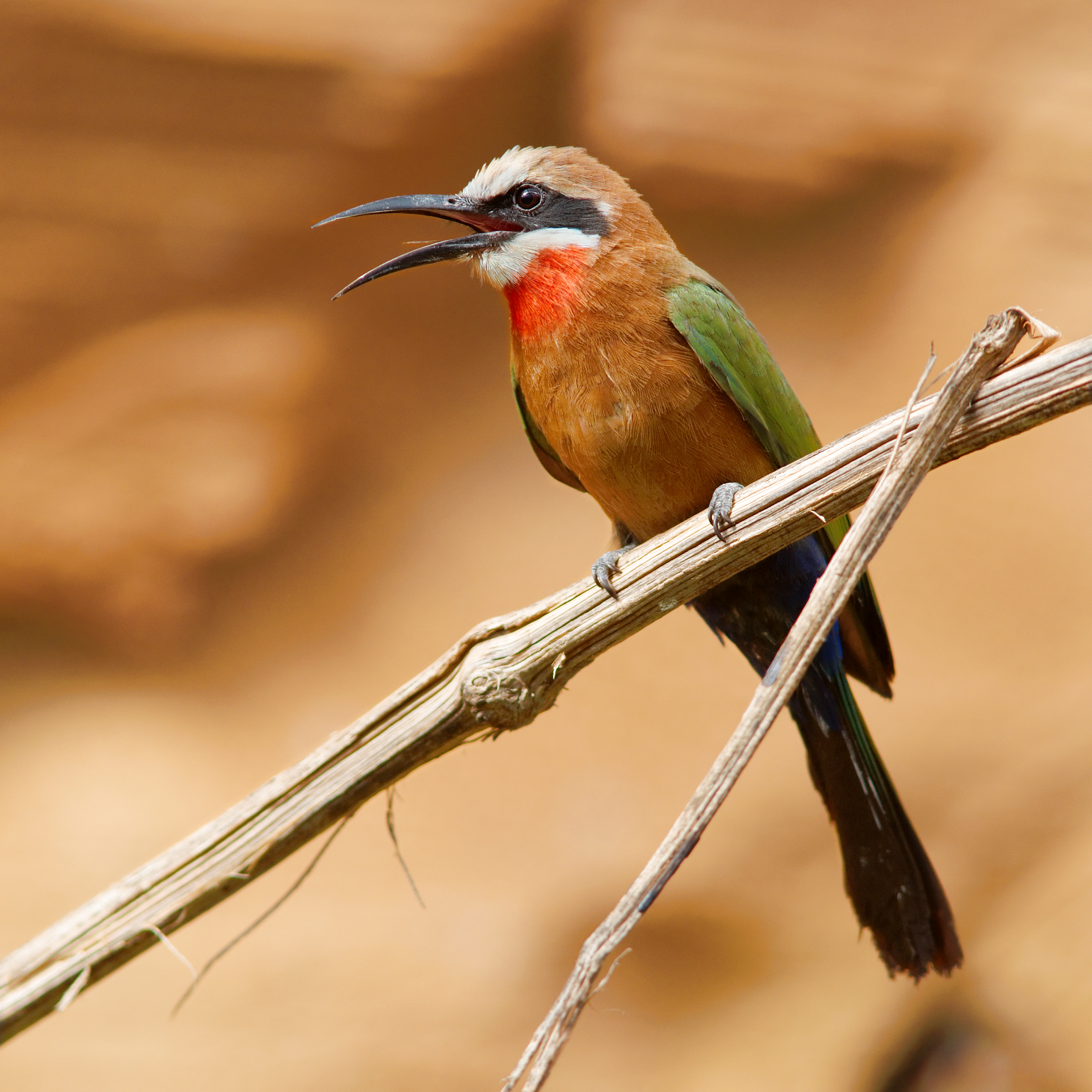
Merops species such as the white-fronted bee-eater usually have a black bar through the eye.

The bee-eaters are morphologically a fairly uniform group. They share many features with related Coraciiformes such as the kingfishers and rollers, being large-headed (although less so than their relatives), short-necked, brightly plumaged and short-legged. Their wings may be rounded or pointed, with the wing shape closely correlated with the species' preferred foraging habitat and migratory tendencies. Shorter, rounder wings are found on species that are sedentary and make typically short foraging flights in denser forests and reed-beds. Those with more elongated wings are more migratory. All the bee-eaters are highly aerial; they take off strongly from perches, fly directly without undulations, and are able to change direction quickly, although they rarely hover.

The flight feathers of the wing comprise 10 primaries, the outermost being very small, and 13 secondaries, and there are 12 tail feathers.

The bills of bee-eaters are curved, long and end in a sharp point. The bill can bite strongly, particularly at the tip, and it is used as a pair of forceps with which to snatch insects from the air and crush smaller prey. The short legs have weak feet, and when it is moving on the ground a bee-eater's gait is barely more than a shuffle. The feet have sharp claws used for perching on vertical surfaces and also for nest excavation.

The plumage of the family is generally very bright and in most species is mainly or at least partially green, although the two carmine bee-eaters are primarily rose-coloured. Most of the Merops bee-eaters have a black bar through the eye and many have differently coloured throats and faces. The extent of the green in these species varies from almost complete in the green bee-eater to barely any green in the white-throated bee-eater. Three species, from equatorial Africa, have no green at all in their plumage, the black bee-eater, the blue-headed bee-eater and the rosy bee-eater. Many species have elongated central tail feathers.

There is little visible difference between the sexes in most of the family, although in several species the iris is red in the males and brown-red in the females, and in species with tail-streamers these may be slightly longer in males. Both the European and red-bearded bee-eaters have sex-based differences in their plumage colour, and the female rainbow bee-eater has shorter tail streamers than the male, which terminate in a club-shape that he lacks. There may be instances where bee-eaters are sexually dichromatic at the ultraviolet part of the colour spectrum, which humans cannot see. A study of blue-tailed bee-eater found that males were more colourful than females in UV light. Their overall colour was also affected by body condition, suggesting that there was a signalling component to plumage colour. Juveniles are generally similar to adults, except for the two Nyctyornis species, in which the young have mainly green plumage.

Bee-eaters have calls that are characteristic for each species. Most sound simple to the human ear, but show significant variability when studied in detail, carrying significant information for the birds.

== Distribution and habitat ==
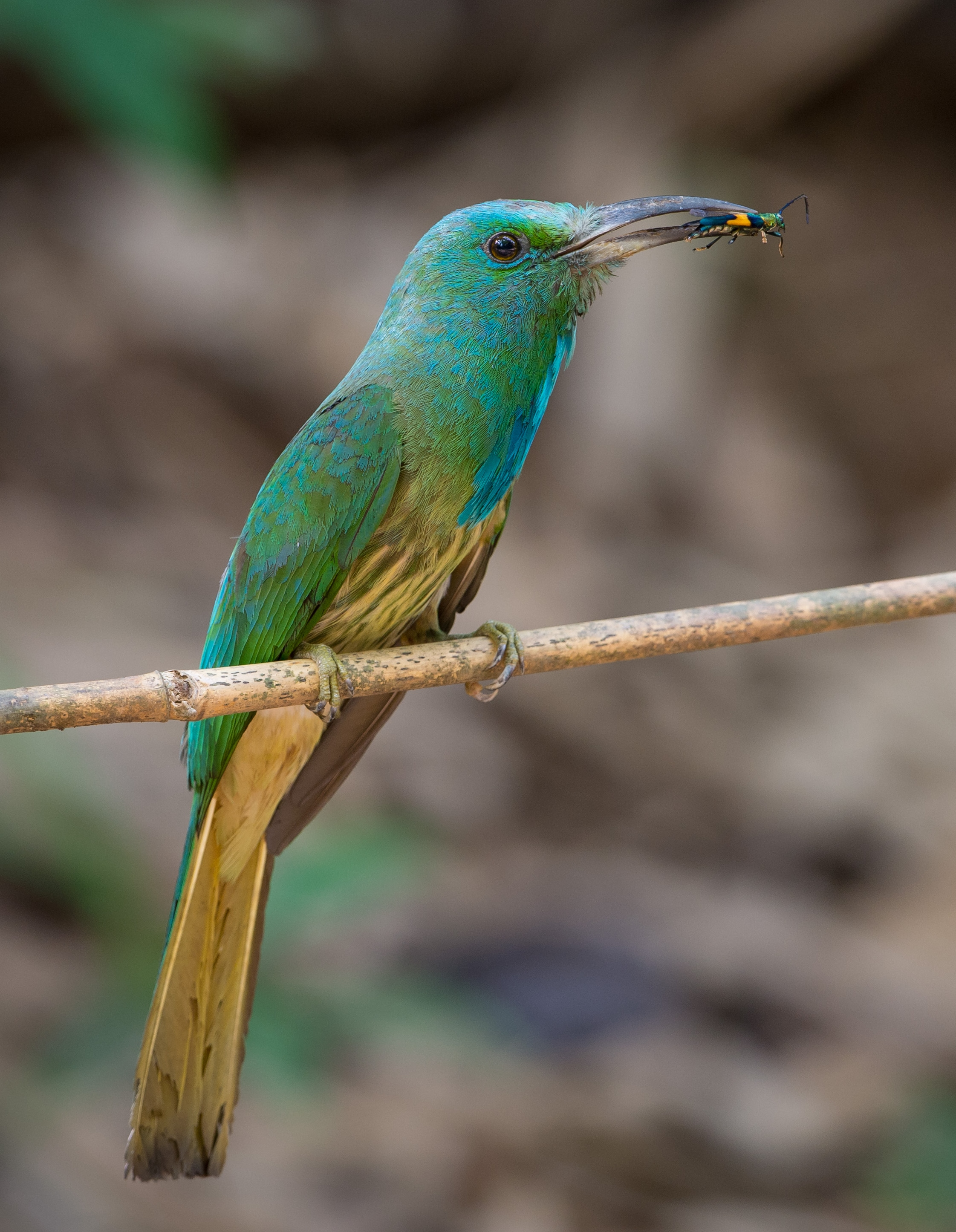
The blue-bearded bee-eater is associated with forests, where it forages in edge habitats

The bee-eaters have an Old World distribution, occurring from Europe to Australia. The centre of diversity of the family is Africa, although a number of species also occur in Asia. Single species occur in each of Europe, (the European bee-eater), Australia (the rainbow bee-eater) and Madagascar (the olive bee-eater, also found on mainland Africa). Of the three genera, Merops, which has the majority of the species, occurs across the entirety of the family's distribution. Nyctyornis is restricted to Asia, ranging from India and southern China to the Indonesian islands of Sumatra and Borneo. The genus Meropogon has a single species restricted to Sulawesi in Indonesia.

Bee-eaters are fairly indiscriminate in their choice of habitat. Their requirements are simply an elevated perch from which to watch for prey and a suitable ground substrate in which to dig their breeding burrow. Because their prey is entirely caught on the wing they are not dependent on any vegetation type. A single species, the blue-headed bee-eater, is found inside closed rainforest where it forages close to the ground in poor light in the gaps between large trees. Six other species are also closely associated with rainforest, but occur in edge habitat such as along rivers, in tree-fall gaps, off trees overhanging ravines or on emergent tree crowns above the main canopy.

Species that breed in subtropical or temperate areas of Europe, Asia and Australia are all migratory. The European bee-eaters that breed in southern Europe and Asia migrate to West and southern Africa. Another population of the same species breeds in South Africa and Namibia; these birds move northwards after breeding. In Australia the rainbow bee-eater is migratory in the southern areas of its range, migrating to Indonesia and New Guinea, but occurs year-round in northern Australia. Several species of bee-eater, are intra-African migrants; the white-throated bee-eater, for example, breeds on the southern edge of the Sahara and winters further south in equatorial rainforest. The most unusual migration is that of the southern carmine bee-eater, which has a three-stage migration; after breeding in a band between Angola and Mozambique it moves south to Botswana, Namibia and South Africa before moving north to its main wintering grounds in northern Angola, Congo and Tanzania.

== Behaviour ==
The bee-eaters are diurnal, although a few species may migrate during the night if the terrain en route is unsuitable for stopping or if they are crossing the sea. Bee-eaters are highly social, and pairs sitting or roosting together are often so close that they touch (an individual distance of zero). Many species are colonial in the breeding season and some species are also highly gregarious when not nesting.

The social structures of the red-throated bee-eater and the white-fronted bee-eaters have been described as more complex than for any other bird species. The birds exist in colonies located on nesting cliffs, and have a stable structure all year round. These colonies typically contain five to 50 burrows, occasionally up to 200, and are composed of clans of two or three pairs, their helpers, and their offspring. The helpers are male offspring from a previous year. Within the colony, the males alternate between guarding their mate and attempting to make forced copulations with other females. The females in turn attempt to lay eggs in their neighbour's nests, an example of brood parasitism. Some individuals also specialise in kleptoparasitism, stealing prey collected by other colony members. The colony's daily routine is to emerge from the nesting holes or roosting branches soon after dawn, preen and sun themselves for an hour, then disperse to feed. Feeding territories are divided by clan, with each clan defending its territory from all others of the same species, including clans of the same colony. The clans return to the colony before dusk, and engage in more social behaviour before retiring for the night. Colonies are situated several hundred metres apart and have little to do with each other, although young individuals may disperse between colonies. As such, these species can be thought to have four tiers of social kinship: the individual pair, the family unit, the clan, and the colony as a whole.

Bee-eaters spend around 10% of their day on comfort activities. These include sunning themselves, dust bathing and water bathing. Sunning behaviour helps warm birds in the morning, reducing the need to use energy to raise their temperature. It also has a social aspect, as multiple birds adopt the same posture. Finally, it may help stimulate parasites in the feathers, making them easier to find and remove. Due to their hole-nesting lifestyle, bee-eaters accumulate a number of external parasites such as mites and flies. Together with sunning, bouts of dust bathing (or water bathing where available), as well as rigorous preening, keep the feathers and skin in good health. Bathing with water involves making shallow dives into a water body and then returning to a perch to preen.

=== Diet and feeding ===
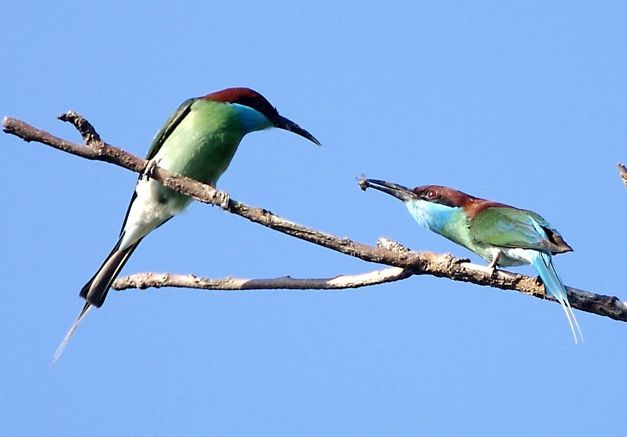
A male blue-throated bee-eater presents his mate with a captured insect

The bee-eaters are almost exclusively aerial hunters of insect prey. Prey is caught either on the wing or more commonly from an exposed perch from which the bee-eater watches for prey. Smaller, rounder-winged bee-eaters typically hunt from branches and twigs closer to the ground, whereas the larger species hunt from tree tops or telephone wires. One unusual technique often used by carmine bee-eaters is to ride on the backs of bustards.

Prey can be spotted from a distance; European bee-eaters are able to spot a bee 60 m (200 ft) away, and blue-cheeked bee-eaters have been observed flying out 100 m (330 ft) to catch large wasps. Prey is approached directly or from behind. Prey that lands on the ground or on plants is usually not pursued. Small prey may be eaten on the wing, but larger items are returned to the perch where they are beaten until dead and then broken up. Insects with poisonous stings are first smacked on the branch, then, with the bird's eyes closed, rubbed to discharge the venom sac and stinger. This behaviour is innate, as demonstrated by a juvenile bird in captivity, which performed the task when first presented with wild bees. This bird was stung on the first five tries, but by ten bees, it was as adept at handling bees as adult birds.

Bee-eaters consume a wide range of insects; beyond a few distasteful butterflies they consume almost any insect from tiny Drosophila flies to large beetles and dragonflies. At some point bee-eaters have been recorded eating beetles, mayflies, stoneflies, cicadas, termites, crickets and grasshoppers, mantises, true flies and moths. For many species, the dominant prey item are stinging members of the order Hymenoptera, namely wasps and bees. In a survey of 20 studies, the proportion of the diet made up by bees and wasps varied from 20% to 96%, with the average being 70%. Of these honeybees can comprise a large part of the diet, as much as 89% of the overall intake. The preference for bees and wasps may have arisen because of the numerical abundance of these suitably sized insects. The giant honeybee is a particularly commonly eaten species. These bees attempt to congregate in a mass defence against the bee-eaters. In Israel, a European bee-eater was documented attempting to eat a small bat that it had caught, which probably could not fit down its throat.

Like kingfishers, bee-eaters regurgitate pellets of undigested material, typically 2 cm (0.8 in) long black oblongs.

==== Predation of honey bees ====
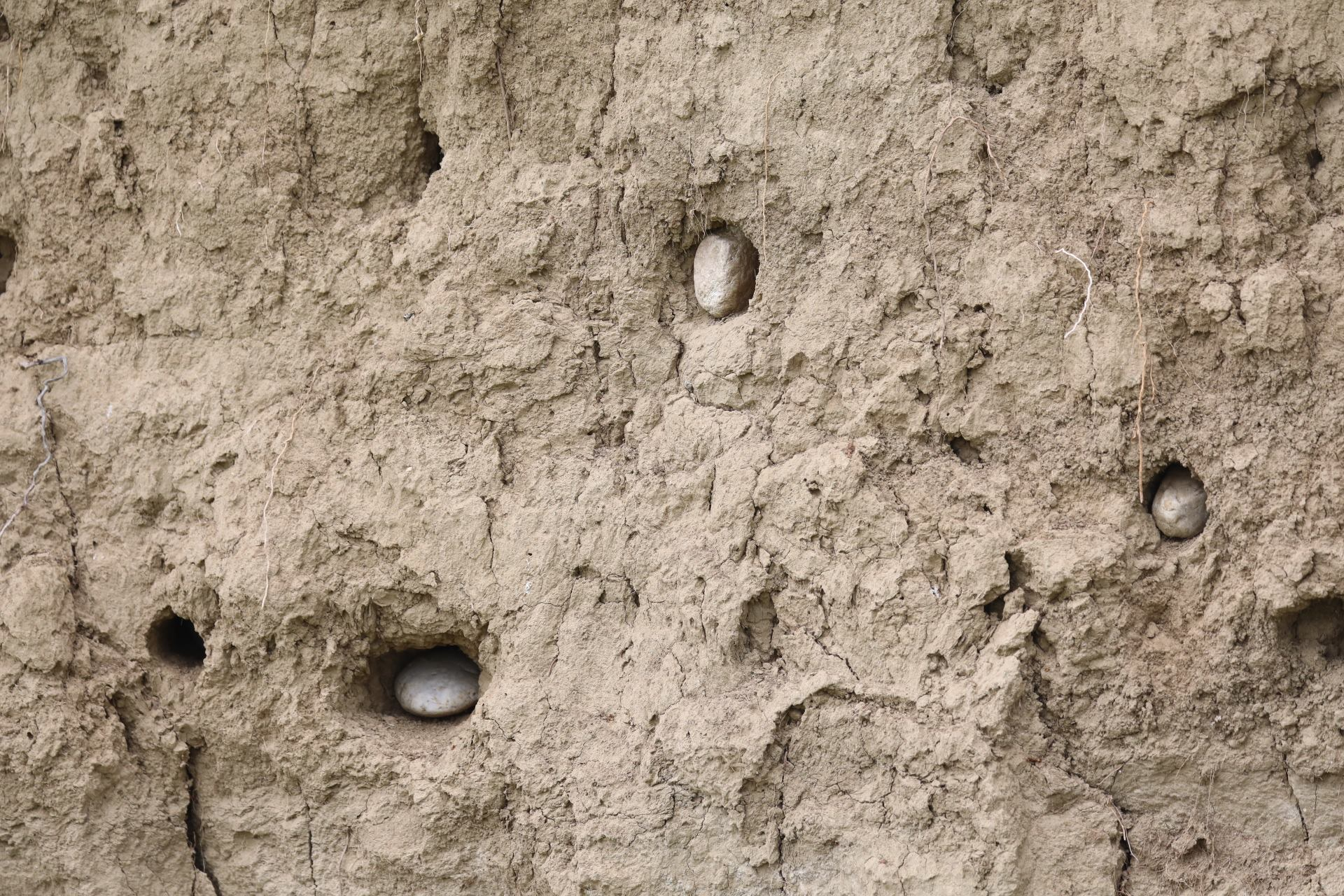
Bee-eater colony destroyed by bee-keepers. The entrances into the bee eater's nests were deliberately blocked with stones

If an apiary is set up close to a bee-eater colony, a larger number of honey bees are eaten because they are more abundant. However, studies show the bee-eaters do not intentionally fly into the apiary, rather they feed on the insects caught on pastures and meadows within a radius of 12 km (7.5 mi) from the colony, this maximum distance being reached only when there is a shortage of food. Observations show that the birds actually enter the apiary only in cold and rainy periods, when the bees do not leave the hive and other insect prey are harder for the bee-eaters to detect.

Many bee-keepers believe that the bee-eaters are the main obstacle causing worker bees not to forage, and instead stay inside the hives for much of the day between May and the end of August. However, a study carried out in a eucalyptus forest in the Alaluas region in the Murqub District in Libya, 80 km (50 mi) east of Tripoli, showed that the bee-eaters were not the main obstacle to bee foraging; in some cases, the foraging rate was higher in the presence of the birds than in their absence. The average bird meal consisted of 90.8% honey bees and 9.2% beetles.

Predation is more likely when the bees are queening or during the peak of migration, from late March till mid-April, and in mid-September. Hives close to or under trees or overhead cables are at increased risk as the birds pounce on flying insects from these perches.

=== Breeding ===
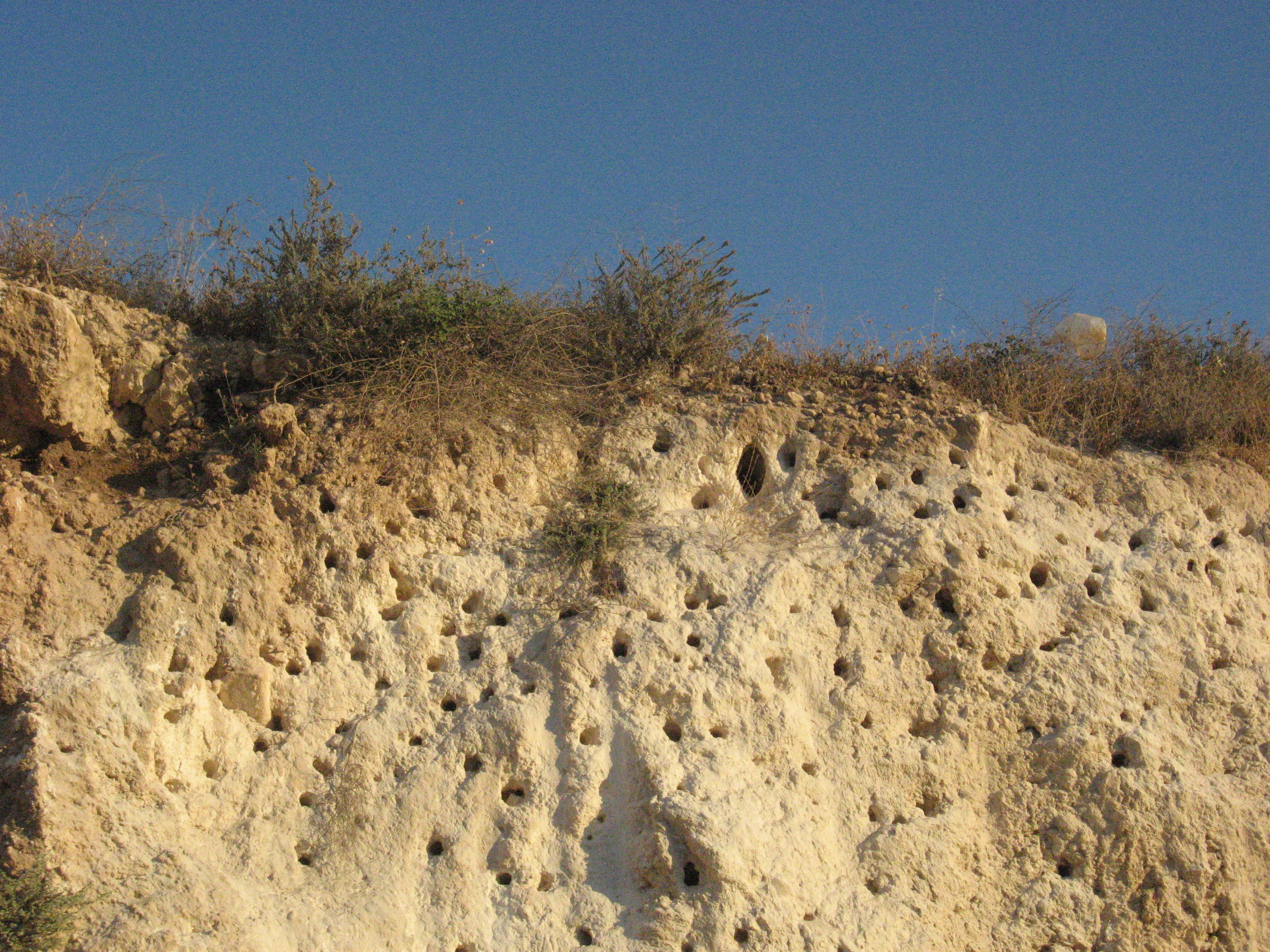
Bee-eater nesting cliff in Modi'in, Israel

Bee-eaters are monogamous during a nesting season, and in sedentary species, pairs may stay together for multiple years. Migratory bee-eaters may find new mates each breeding season. The courtship displays of the bee-eaters are rather unspectacular, with some calling and raising of throat and wing feathers. The exception is the performance of the white-throated bee-eater. Their "butterfly display" involves both members of a pair performing a gliding display flight with shallow wing-beats; they then perch facing each other, raising and folding their wings while calling. Most members of the family engage in courtship feeding, where the male presents prey items to the female, and such feeding can account for much, if not all, of the energy females require for egg creation.

Like almost all Coraciiformes the bee-eaters are cavity nesters. In the case of the bee-eaters the nests are burrows dug into the ground, either into the sides of earth cliffs or directly into level soil. Both types of nesting site are vulnerable, those on level ground are vulnerable to trampling and small predators, whereas those in cliffs, which are often the banks of rivers, are vulnerable to flash floods, which can wipe out dozens or hundreds of nests. Many species will nest either on cliffs or on level ground but prefer cliffs, although Böhm's bee-eater always nests on level ground. The burrows are dug by both birds in the pair, sometimes assisted by helpers. The soil or sand is loosened with jabs of the sharp bill, then the feet are used to kick out the loose soil. It has been suggested that riverine loess deposits that do not crumble when excavated may be favoured by the larger bee-eaters. There may be several false starts where nests are dug partway before being abandoned; in solitary species this can give the impression of colonial living even when that is not the case. The process of nest building can take as long as twenty days to complete, during which time the bill can be blunted and shortened. Nests are generally used only for a single season and are rarely used twice by the bee-eaters, but abandoned nests may be used by other birds, snakes and bats as shelter and breeding sites.

No nesting material is used in the breeding cavity. One white egg is laid each day until the typical clutch of about five eggs is complete. Incubation starts soon after the first egg is laid, with both parents sharing this duty in the day, but only the female at night. The eggs hatch in about 20 days, and the newly hatched young are blind, pink and naked. For most species, the eggs do not all hatch at the same time, so if food is in short supply only the older chicks survive. Adults and young defecate in the nest, and their pellets are trodden underfoot, making the nest cavity very malodorous. The chicks are in the nest for about 30 days.

Bee-eaters may nest as single pairs, loose colonies or dense colonies. Smaller species tend to nest solitarily, while medium-sized bee-eaters have small colonies, and larger and migratory species nest in large colonies that can number in the thousands. In some instances, colonies may contain more than one species of bee-eater. In species that nest gregariously, breeding pairs may be assisted by up to five helpers. These birds may alternate between breeding themselves and helping in successive years.

== Predators and parasites ==
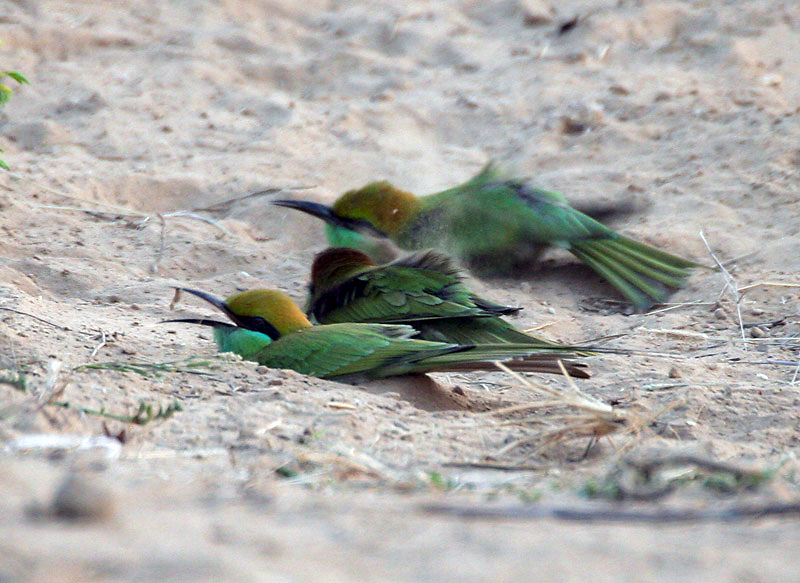
Asian green bee-eaters dust bathing to keep down parasites

Bee-eater nests may be raided by rats and snakes, and the adults are hunted by birds of prey such as the Levant sparrowhawk. The little bee-eater and red-throated bee-eaters are hosts of the greater honeyguide and the lesser honeyguide, both brood parasites. The young honeyguides kill the bee-eater's chicks and destroy any eggs. The begging call of the honeyguide sounds like two bee-eater chicks, ensuring a good supply of food from the adult bee-eaters.

Bee-eaters may be infested by several blood-feeding flies of the genus Carnus, and the biting fly Ornithophila metallica. Other parasites include chewing lice of the genera Meromenopon, Brueeliaa and Meropoecus, some of which are specialist parasites of bee-eaters, and the stickfast flea Echidnophaga gallinacea. The hole-nesting lifestyle of bee-eaters means that they tend to carry a higher burden of external parasites than non-hole-nesting bird species. Bee-eaters may also be infected by protozoan blood parasites of the genus Haemoproteus including H. meropis.

Fly larvae of the genus Fannia live in the nests of at least European bee-eaters, and feed on faeces and food remains. Their presence and cleaning activities appear to benefit the developing bee-eaters.

== Status ==
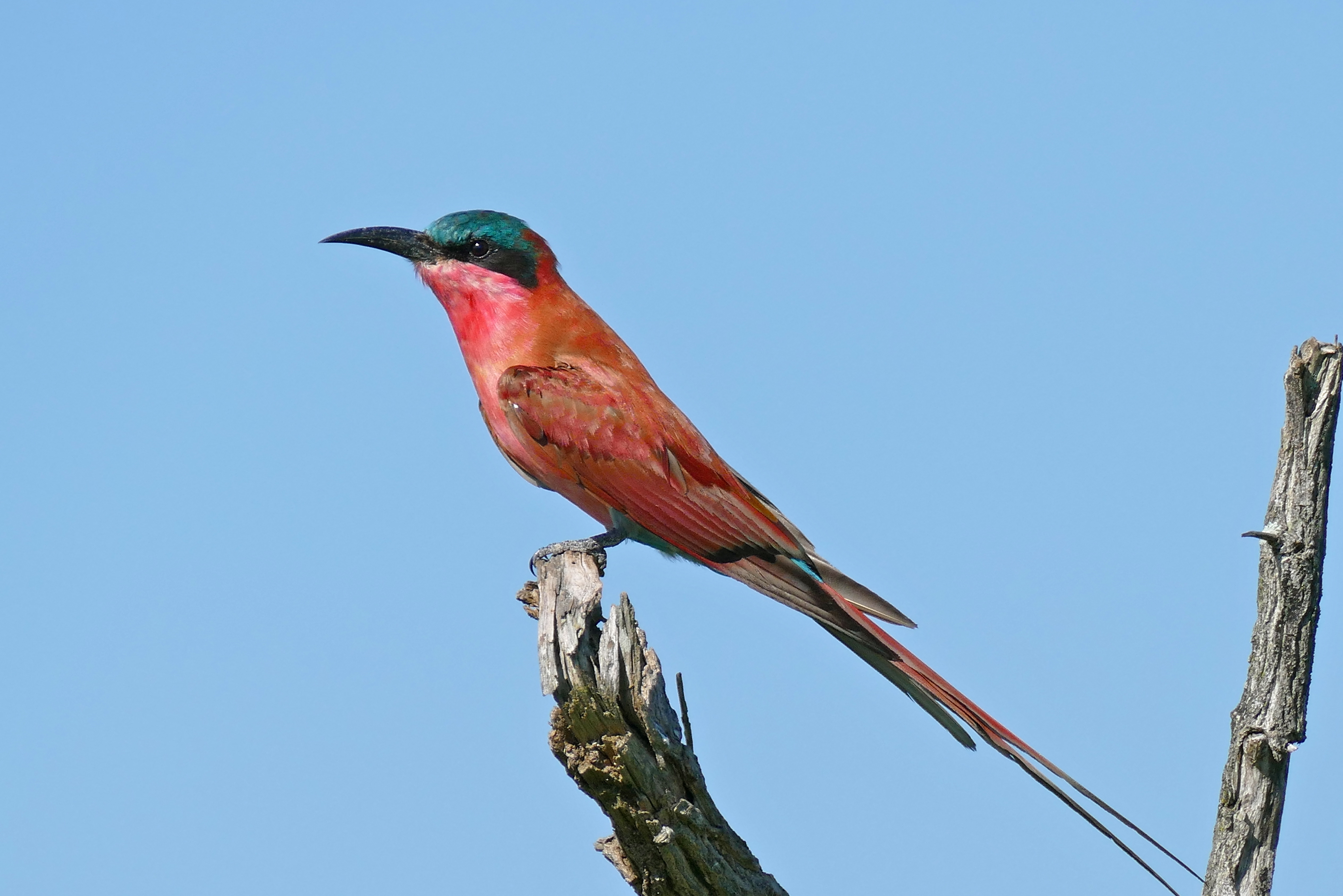
The southern carmine bee-eater is adversely affected by persecution and habitat loss.

The International Union for Conservation of Nature (IUCN) assesses species vulnerability in terms of total population and the rate of any population decline. None of the bee-eaters meet the IUCN vulnerability criteria, and all are therefore evaluated as "Least-concern species".

Open country species, which comprise the majority of bee-eaters, have mostly expanded in range as more land is converted to agriculture, but some tropical forest species have suffered declines through loss of habitat, although no species or subspecies gives serious cause for concern. There is some human persecution of bee-eaters, with nest holes being blocked, adults shot or limed, or young taken for food. More generally problematic is the unintended destruction of nests. This can occur through cattle trampling, as with the blue-headed bee-eater in Kenya, or loss of forests, with massive conversion of native forest to oil palm plantations in Malaysia being particularly concerning.

A study of the southern carmine bee-eater in Zimbabwe showed that it was affected by deliberate interference and persecution and loss of woodlands, and that nesting sites are lost through poor water management leading to river bank damage, dam construction and panning for gold. Colonies are becoming concentrated into the national parks and the Zambezi Valley. The well-studied European bee-eater is trapped and shot on migration in countries bordering the Mediterranean, an estimated 4,000–6,000 annually being killed illegally by poachers in Cyprus alone, where it is a protected species.

== In culture ==
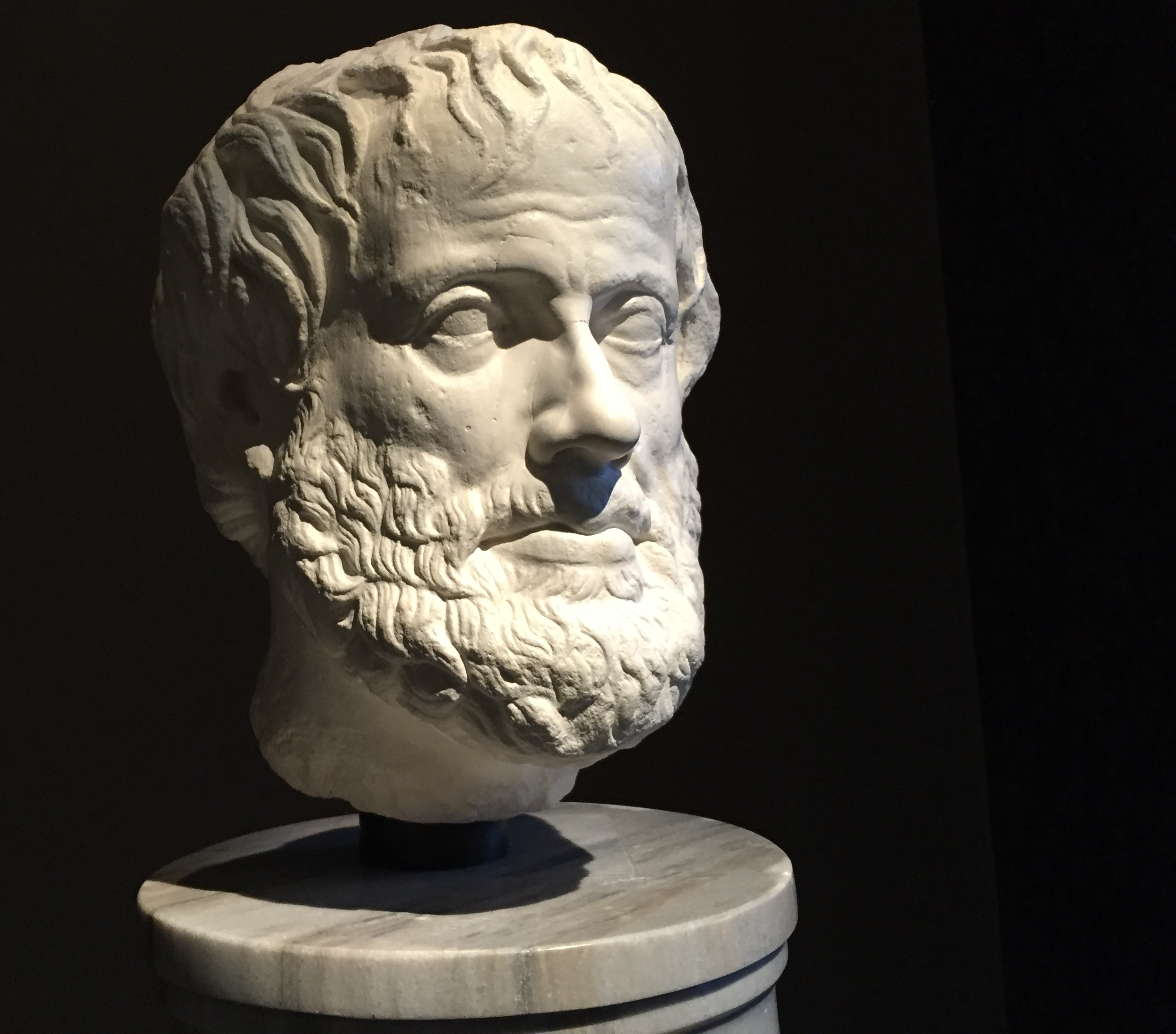
Aristotle advised the killing of bee-eaters to protect hives

Bee-eaters were mentioned by ancient writers such as Aristotle and Virgil, who both advised beekeepers to kill the birds. Aristotle knew that bee-eaters nested at the end of tunnels up to 2 m (6.6 ft) long and the size of their clutch. He said that nesting adults were fed by their own young, based on the observed actual help at the nest by related birds.

In Greek mythology, the Theban Botres was fatally struck by his father when he desecrated a ritual sacrifice of a ram to the god Apollo by tasting the victim's brains. The god took pity on him, turning him into a bee-eater.

The Ancient Egyptians believed that bee-eaters had medical properties, prescribing the application of bee-eater fat to deter biting flies, and treating the eyes with the smoke from charred bee-eater legs to cure an unspecified female complaint.

In Hinduism, the shape of the bird in flight was thought to resemble a bow, with the long bill as an arrow. This led to a Sanskrit name meaning "Vishnu's bow" and an association with archer gods. Scandalmongers were thought to be reincarnated as bee-eaters, because of the metaphorical poison they bore in their mouths.

Depictions in classical art are rare for such striking birds. The only known Ancient Egyptian example is a relief, probably of a little green bee-eater, on a wall of Queen Hatshepsut's mortuary temple, and an early Roman mural depicting blue-cheeked bee-eaters was found in the villa of Agrippina. Bee-eaters have been depicted on the postage stamps of at least 38 countries, the European and carmine bee-eaters (now split into northern and southern species) being the most common subjects, with 18 and 11 countries respectively.
