= Carmine bee-eater =

Index of birds with the same common name

Carmine bee-eater may refer to:

- Northern carmine bee-eater (Merops nubicus or Merops nubicus nubicus)
- Southern carmine bee-eater (Merops nubicoides or Merops nubicus nubicoides)
