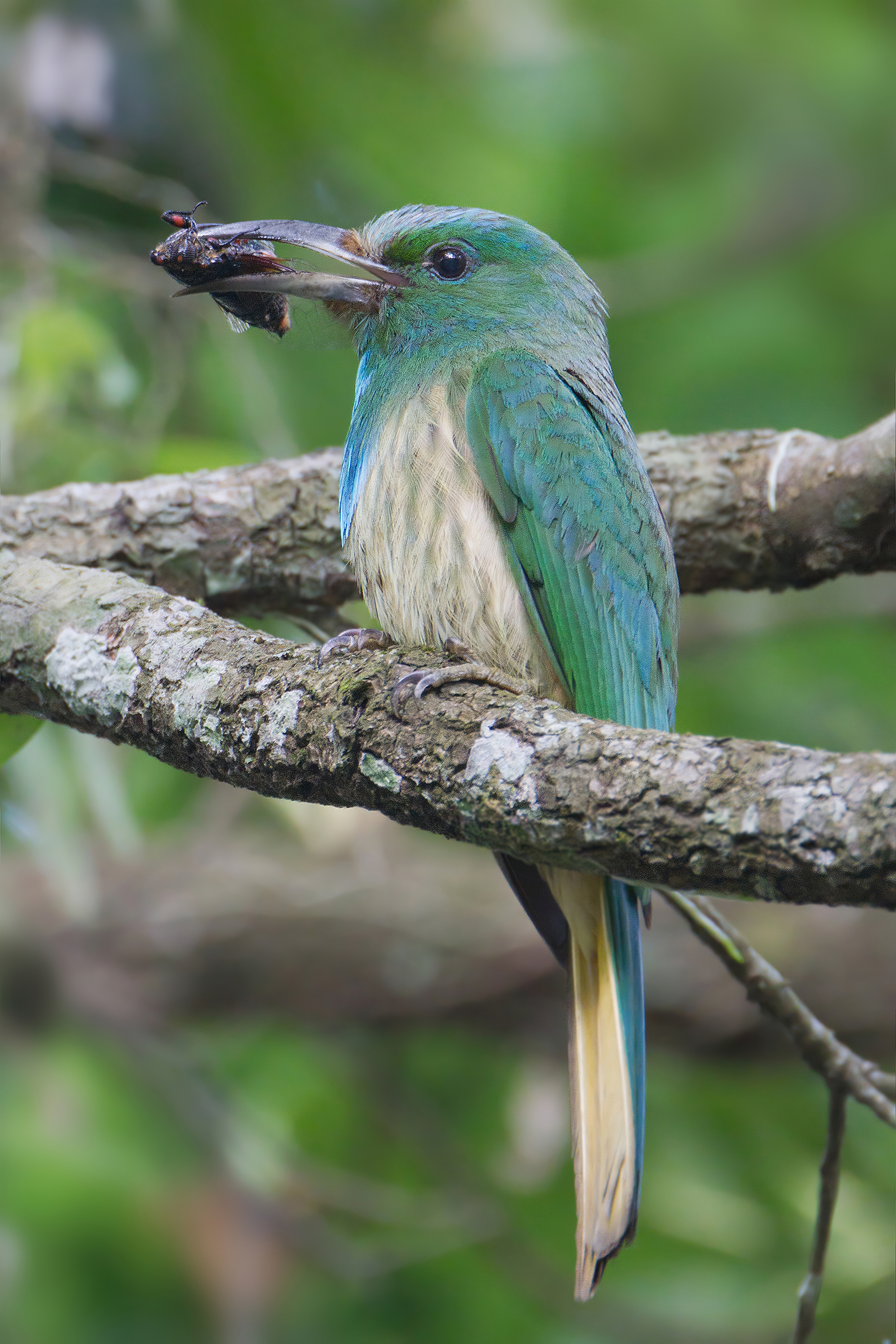
- Preying on a cicada. Thailand. Calls

Conservation status
- Least Concern (IUCN 3.1)

Scientific classification
- Kingdom: Animalia
- Phylum: Chordata
- Class: Aves
- Order: Coraciiformes
- Family: Meropidae
- Genus: Nyctyornis
- Species: N. athertoni

Binomial name
- Nyctyornis athertoni (Jardine & Selby, 1828)
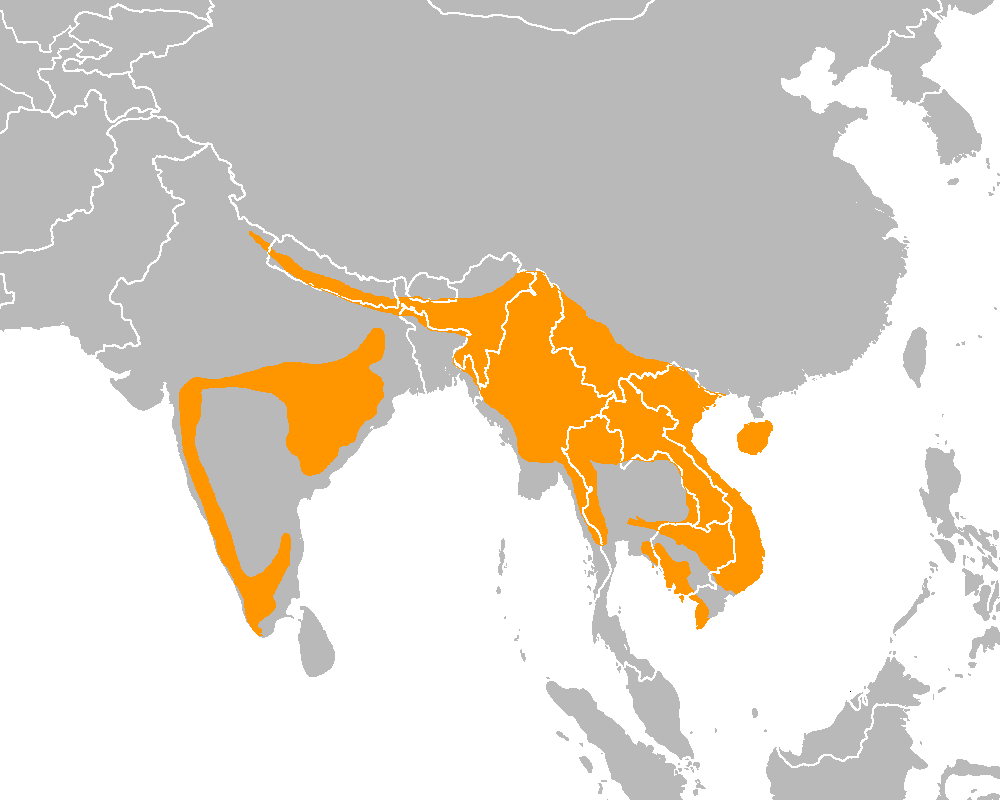
- Distribution of the Nyctyornis athertoni

Synonyms
- Merops athertoni Alcemerops athertoni

= Blue-bearded bee-eater =

Species of bird

The blue-bearded bee-eater (Nyctyornis athertoni) is a species of bee-eater found in much of the Indian subcontinent and parts of Southeast Asia. This bee-eater is found in forest clearings. It is found mainly in the Malayan region but extends west into peninsular India. The blue feathers of its throat are elongated and often fluffed giving it its name. They have a loud call but are not as gregarious or active as the smaller bee-eaters, and their square ended tail lacks the typical "wires" made up of the shafts of the longer central tail feathers found in many other bee-eaters.

== Description ==
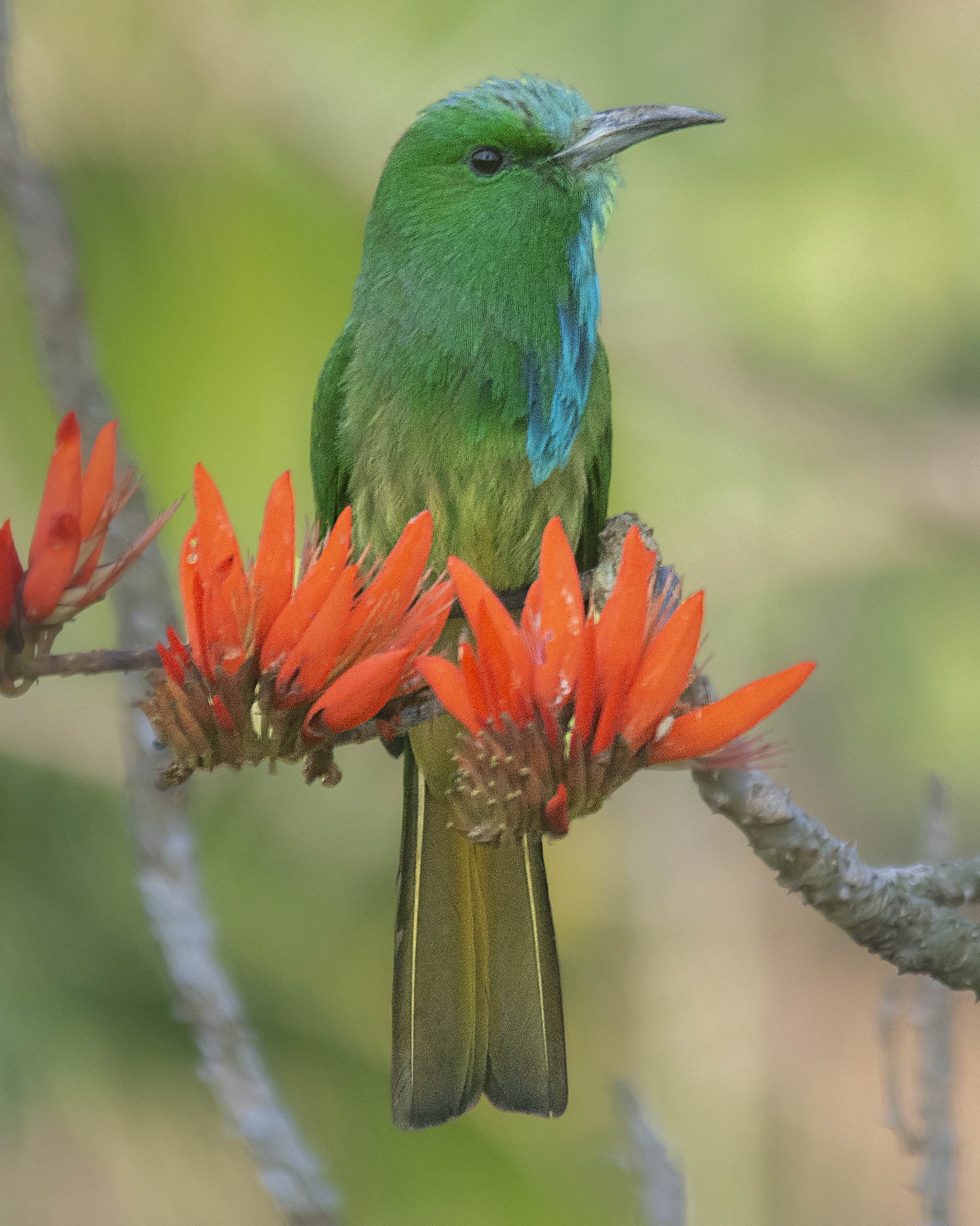
Nominate subspecies perched on an Erythrina sp., Bangladesh

This is probably the largest species of the bee-eater family. Adults measure 31 to 35 cm (12 to 14 in) in length and weigh 70 to 93 g (2.5 to 3.3 oz). This species has a large sickle shaped bill and the square ended tail lacks the "wires" that are typical of smaller bee-eaters. The bird is grass green with a turquoise forehead, face and chin. The feathers of the throat are elongated giving it a bearded appearance when they are fluffed out. The belly is yellowish to olive with streaks of green or blue. The peninsular Indian populations are said to be paler green than the northeast Indian populations. Although males and females appear similar, the blue throat feathers of the male show higher ultraviolet reflectivity than those of the female.

The species is named after Lieut. John Atherton (13th Light Dragoons, died in 1827) a nephew of Mrs. P. J. Selby who obtained a specimen of the bird. Selby described the species in "Illustrations of Ornithology" published along with Sir William Jardine in 1828. Jardine and Selby described it in the Illustrations of Ornithology (Series 1, Volume 2 part 4, November 1828, plate 58) and the type locality (holotype is in the Selby Collection, UMZC, 25/Mer/7/b/2) was said to be Cachar District Assam by E. C. Stuart Baker but Sir N B Kinnear re-designated Bangalore as the type locality for the species based on the fact that Atherton was posted in Bangalore when he wrote to Selby and noted that he was helped by a French collector (thought to be Leschenault). However the species is rare in that region. Atherton informed Selby that the bird was very rare, found in the thickest jungles, feeding at night and noisy with "curr, curr" calls.

The nominate form is found in India and parts of mainland Southeast Asia while brevicaudatus is an insular population from Hainan. A subspecies bartletti from northeastern India, described by W. N. Koelz, is usually considered part of the nominate population.

== Distribution and habitat ==
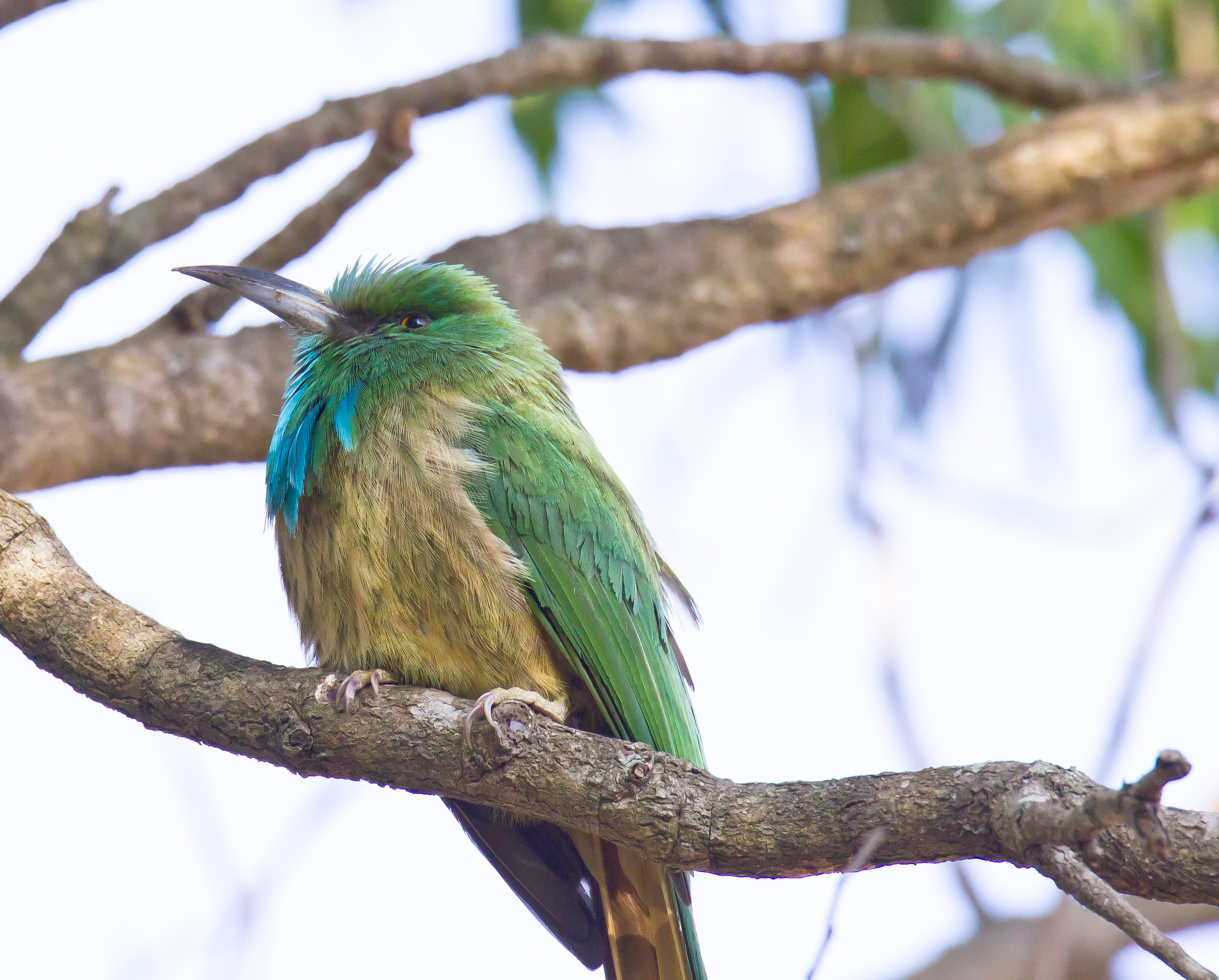
The feathers of the chin are long and sometimes raised up into a "beard".

This species is found in a variety of habitats mostly at medium altitudes but below 2000m altitude. Thin to fairly thick forest in medium elevations with clearings is the typical habitat. It is found singly or in small groups of up to three and is very patchily distributed. Their presence in an area can easily be missed. It has been reported from the hill regions of the Satpuras, Western Ghats, Eastern Ghats, Nilgiris, Chota Nagpur and from the Sub-Himalayan forests.

== Behaviour and ecology ==
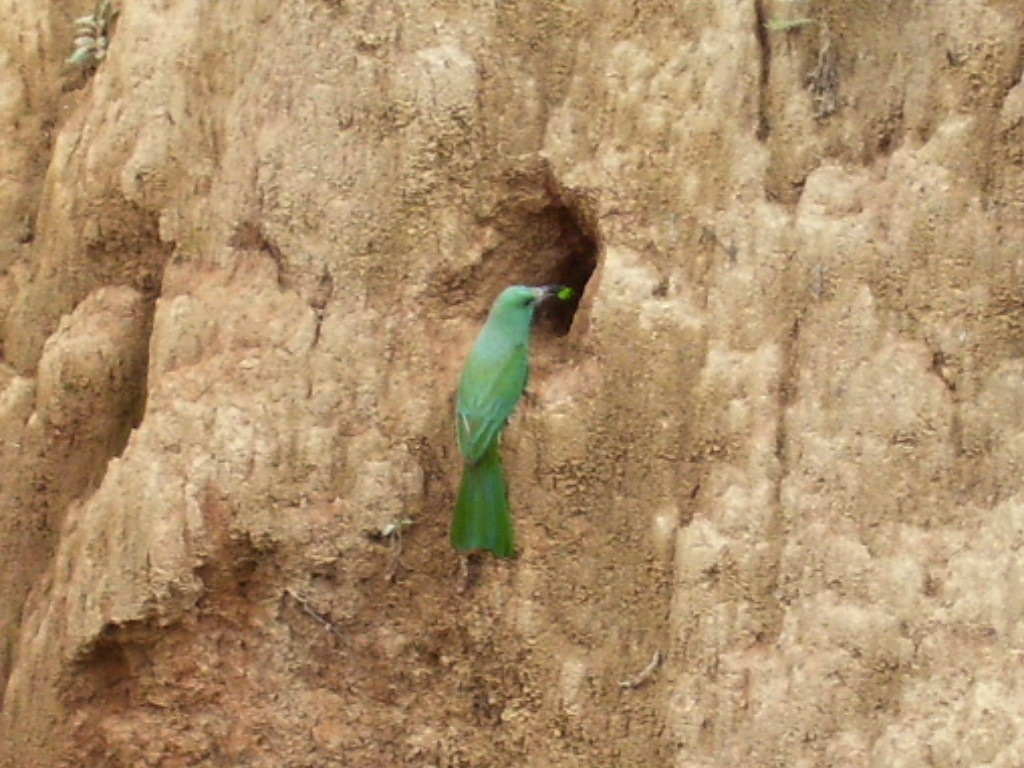
The nest tunnel excavated in a vertical mud bank

This bird has a loud call, but does not call frequently. It is also not as active as the smaller bee-eaters. The calls include cackling hornbill like calls, a dry "Kit-tik... Kit-tik" in a series or hollow nasal "kyao" calls. Pairs may engage in duets of cackling and rattling which ends in short purring notes. The flight is undulating and very barbet-like.

The breeding season is February to August in India and courtship involves ritual feeding, bowing and tail fanning. Nest excavation may begin a month before the laying of eggs. The nest is a deep tunnel in a mud bank within which four very spherical and white eggs are laid.

The species appears to feed mainly on bees. It exploits the defensive behavior of Giant honey bee (Apis dorsata) colonies by provoking the mass release of guard bees which are then caught in the air and eaten as they pursue the bird. Although mainly foraging using aerial sallies, it is known to sometimes glean from bark. They may sometimes associate with mixed-species foraging flocks. Birds have been seen at flowers of Erythrina and Salmalia although it is unclear whether they fed on nectar or insects attracted to the flowers.

A blood parasite Leucocytozoon nyctyornis has been described from this species and feather parasites in the genus Brueelia are also known.
