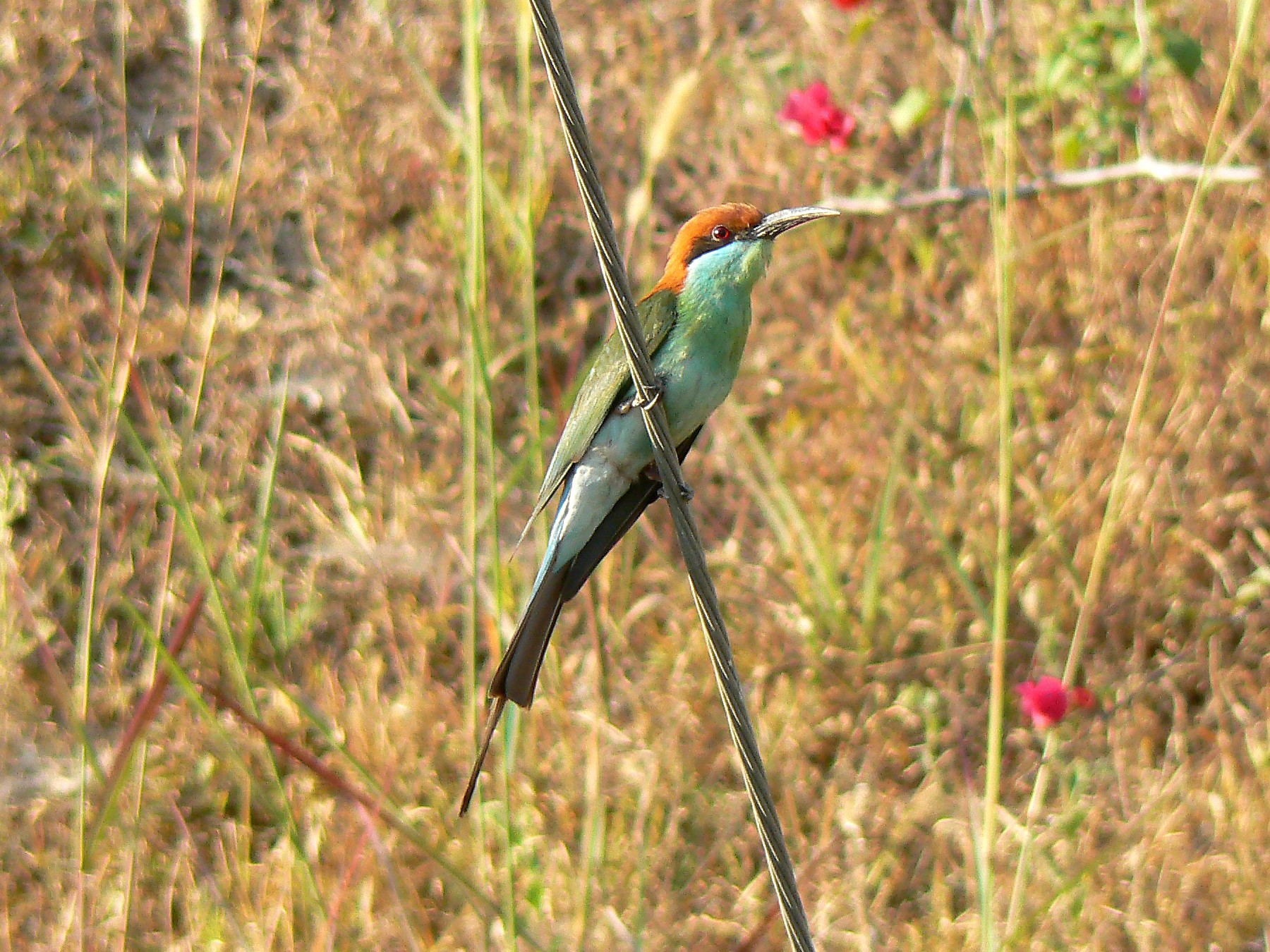

Conservation status
- Least Concern (IUCN 3.1)

Scientific classification
- Kingdom: Animalia
- Phylum: Chordata
- Class: Aves
- Order: Coraciiformes
- Family: Meropidae
- Genus: Merops
- Species: M. americanus

Binomial name
- Merops americanus Müller, 1776

Synonyms
- Merops viridis americanus

= Rufous-crowned bee-eater =

Species of bird

The rufous-crowned bee-eater (Merops americanus) is a species of bird in the family Meropidae. It is endemic to the Philippines, where it is widely distributed. Despite its scientific name, it is not found in the New World, and its name is likely erroneous.

== Description and taxonomy ==
It was previously considered a subspecies of the blue-throated bee-eater (M. viridis), but was split as a distinct species by the IUCN Red List and BirdLife International in 2014, and the International Ornithological Congress followed suit in 2022. It is still confused with M. viridis as it is still called blue-throated bee-eater by many including eBird. It differs from M. viridis in having a red-brown crown and mantle (rather than dark brown), and a paler greenish-blue throat and cheeks (rather than dark blue).

== Ecology and behavior ==
This specific species has yet to be studied in depth. This species is presumed to be an insectivore, and true to its name feeds heavily on bees. This species is considered a pest by bee-keepers. This species breeds from February to May in communal nest burrows on sloping ground and banks. These tunnels go as far as 1 m deep. Average clutch size 3 to 5 eggs.

== Habitat and conservation status ==
It inhabits open country and clearings adjacent to forested areas, including over scrub and cogon fields, using dead trees and telephone wires as perches.

The IUCN Red List has assessed this bird as least-concern species as it is common and is able to tolerate open habitat.
