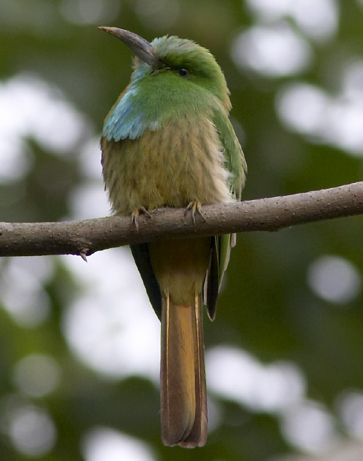
- Blue-bearded bee-eater (Nyctyornis athertoni)

Scientific classification
- Kingdom: Animalia
- Phylum: Chordata
- Class: Aves
- Order: Coraciiformes
- Family: Meropidae
- Genus: Nyctyornis; Jardine & Selby, 1830

Type species
- Merops amictus Temminck, 1824

Species
- See text

= Nyctyornis =

Genus of birds

Nyctyornis is a genus of the bee-eaters, birds in the family Meropidae. There are just two members of this group, which occur in tropical south and southeastern Asia.

Image	Scientific name	Common name	Distribution
	Nyctyornis amictus	Red-bearded bee-eater	Southeast Asia
	Nyctyornis athertoni	Blue-bearded bee-eater	Indian subcontinent and parts of Southeast Asia

The genus Nyctyornis was introduced by the naturalists William Jardine and Prideaux John Selby in 1830. The name comes from the Ancient Greek nukt meaning nocturnal or night and ornis meaning bird. A molecular phylogenetic study published in 2007 showed that the genus is basal and forms a sister group to the remaining members of the bee-eater family.

Like other bee-eaters, Nyctyornis species are colourful birds with long tails, long downturned bills and pointed wings. They are large bee-eaters (blue-bearded is the largest of all bee-eaters), predominantly green, with a face colour as indicated by the species' name. This colour extends on to the slightly hanging throat feathers to form the "beard".

The two Nyctyornis species are the only bee-eaters that lack an eye-stripe and that have bi-coloured beaks. Their calls also differ from those of other bee-eaters and are somewhat similar to the noises made by rollers. Their size and more rounded wings give a heavier flapping flight that is less graceful than that of members of the genus Merops.

In common with other bee-eaters, they predominantly eat insects, especially bees, wasps and hornets, which are caught in the air, but they have a rather different strategy. They hunt alone or in pairs, rather than in groups, and sit motionless for long periods before pursuing their prey. The blue-bearded bee-eater will also clamber in foliage for insects, and bees are sometimes attracted by the bright blue beard of a perched bird, presumably mistaking it for a flower. They nest in burrows tunneled into the side of sandy banks, but do not form colonies.

== Sources ==
- Fry, C. Hilary; Fry, Kathie; Harris, Alan (1992). Kingfishers, Bee-eaters, and Rollers. London: Christopher Helm. ISBN 978-0-7136-8028-7.
