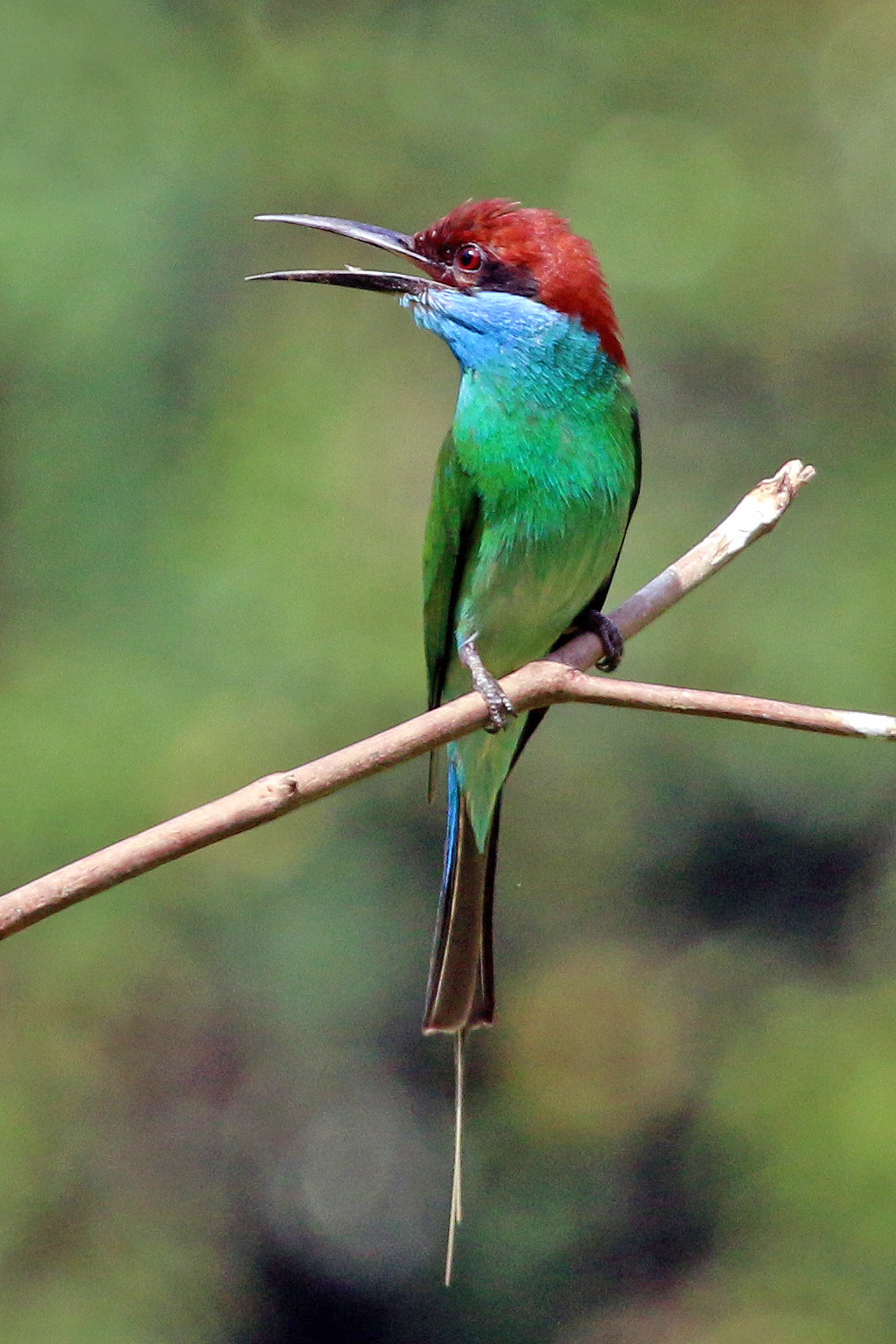
- Danum Valley, Borneo, Malaysia

Conservation status
- Least Concern (IUCN 3.1)

Scientific classification
- Kingdom: Animalia
- Phylum: Chordata
- Class: Aves
- Order: Coraciiformes
- Family: Meropidae
- Genus: Merops
- Species: M. viridis

Binomial name
- Merops viridis Linnaeus, 1758
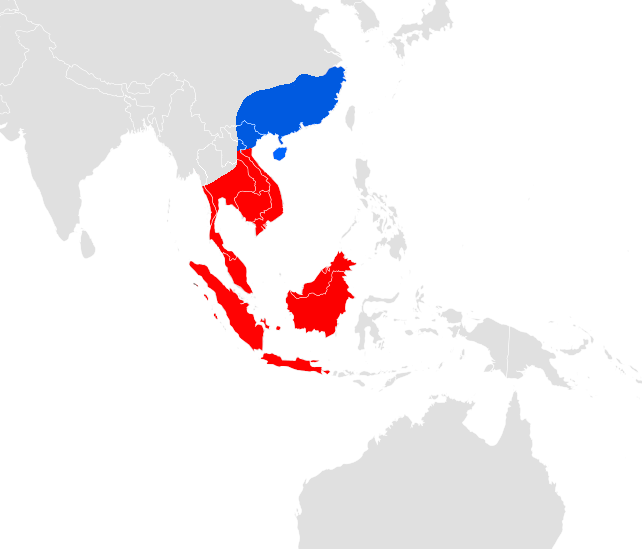
- Resident distribution in red, and additional summer breeding distribution in blue, of blue-throated bee-eaters in Southeast Asia

Synonyms
- Chestnut-headed bee-eater

= Blue-throated bee-eater =

Species of bird

The blue-throated bee-eater (Merops viridis) is a species of bird in the bee-eater family. It is found in much of southeast Asia, in subtropical or tropical mangrove forests. Their diet consists mostly of bees, wasps, and dragonflies. Blue-throated bee-eater is a medium-large species of bee-eater with brightly coloured plumage consisting of a red-brown nape, dark green wings, light green breast, and their signature blue throat. The juvenile plumage has a dark green head and wings and light green breast, only developing their full plumage in adulthood. They have a rich variety of songs and calls, including long calls which allow them to communicate long distances in the forest.

The conservation status of the blue-throated bee-eaters is of "least concern" due to their large distribution and stability of its population as of 2024. However, deforestation may be its biggest threat, destroying its habitat and decreasing bird diversity generally.

== Taxonomy ==
The blue-throated bee-eater was formally described in 1758 by the Swedish naturalist Carl Linnaeus in the tenth edition of his Systema Naturae under the current binomial name Merops viridis. The type locality is the Indonesian island of Java. The specific epithet viridis is Latin meaning "green". The species is monotypic, with no subspecies being recognised. It was however formerly considered to be conspecific with the rufous-crowned bee-eater (now M. americanus) of the Philippines as M. viridis americanus, until an analysis of Philippine birds recommended splitting it. An alternative common name is the chestnut-headed bee-eater.

== Description ==
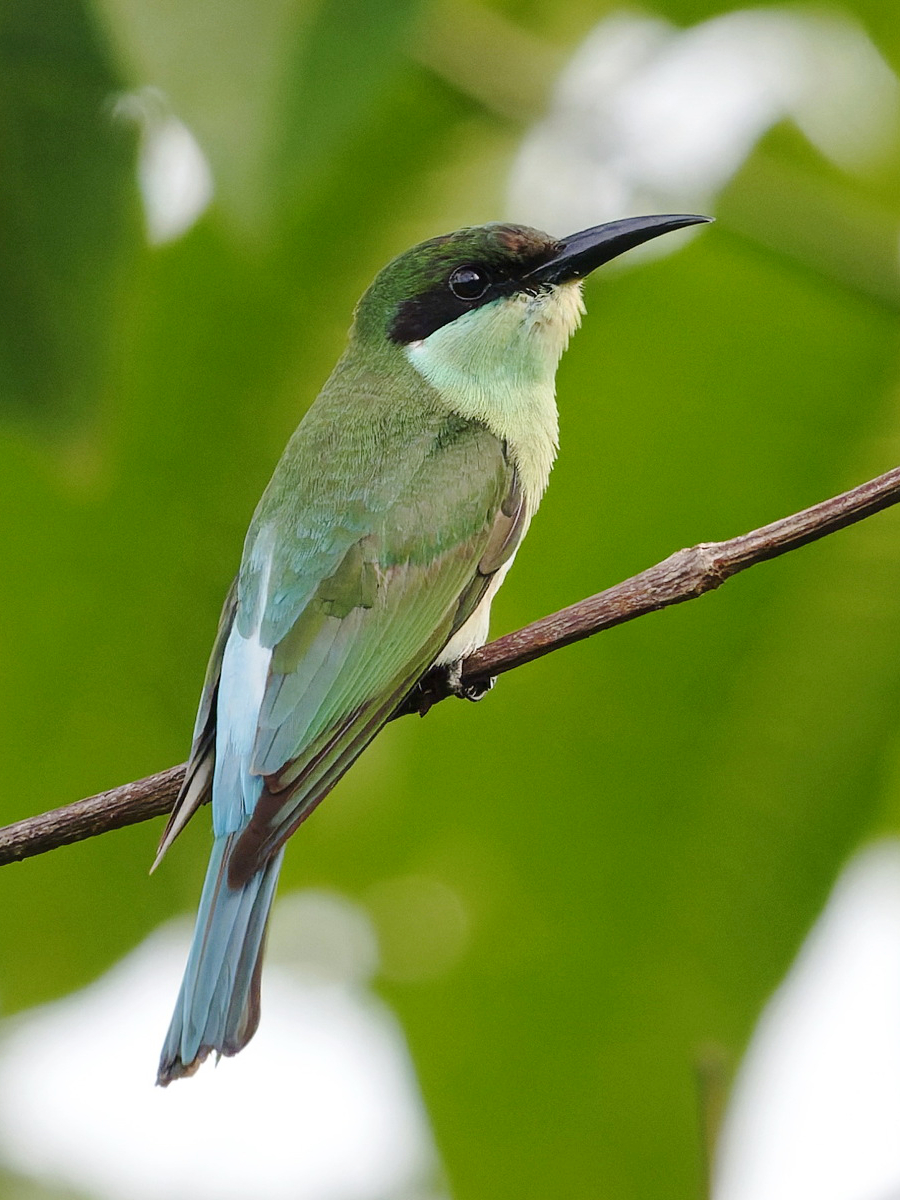
Juvenile, in Sabah, Malaysia

Adult blue-throated bee-eaters are around 21 cm long, excluding the elongated central tail feathers, which are an additional 9 cm, and a weight of around 34–41 grams. Adults have spectacular plumage with a red-brown crown and nape, dark green wings, blue tail, light green breast and belly, and the signature blue throat. Juveniles are mostly green all over their body, developing their full plumage later; they have a dark green head and wings and light green breast, and also lack the elongated central tail feathers of adults. Both adults and juveniles have black eye stripes. The eyes range between red and brown, or a combination.

== Distribution and habitat ==
They have a wide distribution ranging from southeastern China to the Greater Sundas Islands. The most concentrated distribution is found in Singapore, Malaysia, southern Cambodia, and southern Thailand. Other locations with greater dispersal include Borneo and Java. It is most widespread at low altitudes, between 0–670 m, but is known to occur up to 1,600 m.

Their habitat includes a wide variety of flat plains, such as farmland, suburban gardens, riversides, dunes, and sandy clearings. In the winter, some blue-throated bee-eaters move to forest canopies and saltwater channels of mangrove forests. Unlike most bee-eaters which dig nest burrows in near-vertical sand cliffs, they often dig nest burrows nearly horizontally into flat ground. Colony sizes range from 50 to 200 pairs or living completely solitary in the open country.

=== Migration ===
Each spring, blue-throated bee-eaters (Merops viridis) along with blue-tailed bee-eaters (Merops philippinus) migrate from Sumatra, cross the Straits of Malacca, and end up on the west coast of Malaysia. The observed flight locomotion from Tanjung Tuan, west coast of Malaysia, was a combination of flapping and gliding flight. Occasionally, they would use the air currents from the sea-breeze to soar upwards. Once reaching land, they would rest on the lighthouse and tree branches for up to ten minutes before continuing eastward. This migration was observed from 2000 to 2001 with a total of 2,226 bee-eaters, including 1353 blue-tailed bee-eaters and 222 blue-throated bee-eaters, with the rest unidentified. The most observed migrating bee-eaters occurred on 21 March 2000 between 1 and 2PM. The high number observations of bee-eaters were most likely due to the strong thermals that formed over Sumatra, allowing them to soar over the sea-breeze with ease. High numbers of bee-eaters were also observed to migrate when there were high westerly winds blowing towards Malaysia. Blue-throated bee-eaters also migrate onto breeding grounds of western China during breeding season as shown in the range map above.

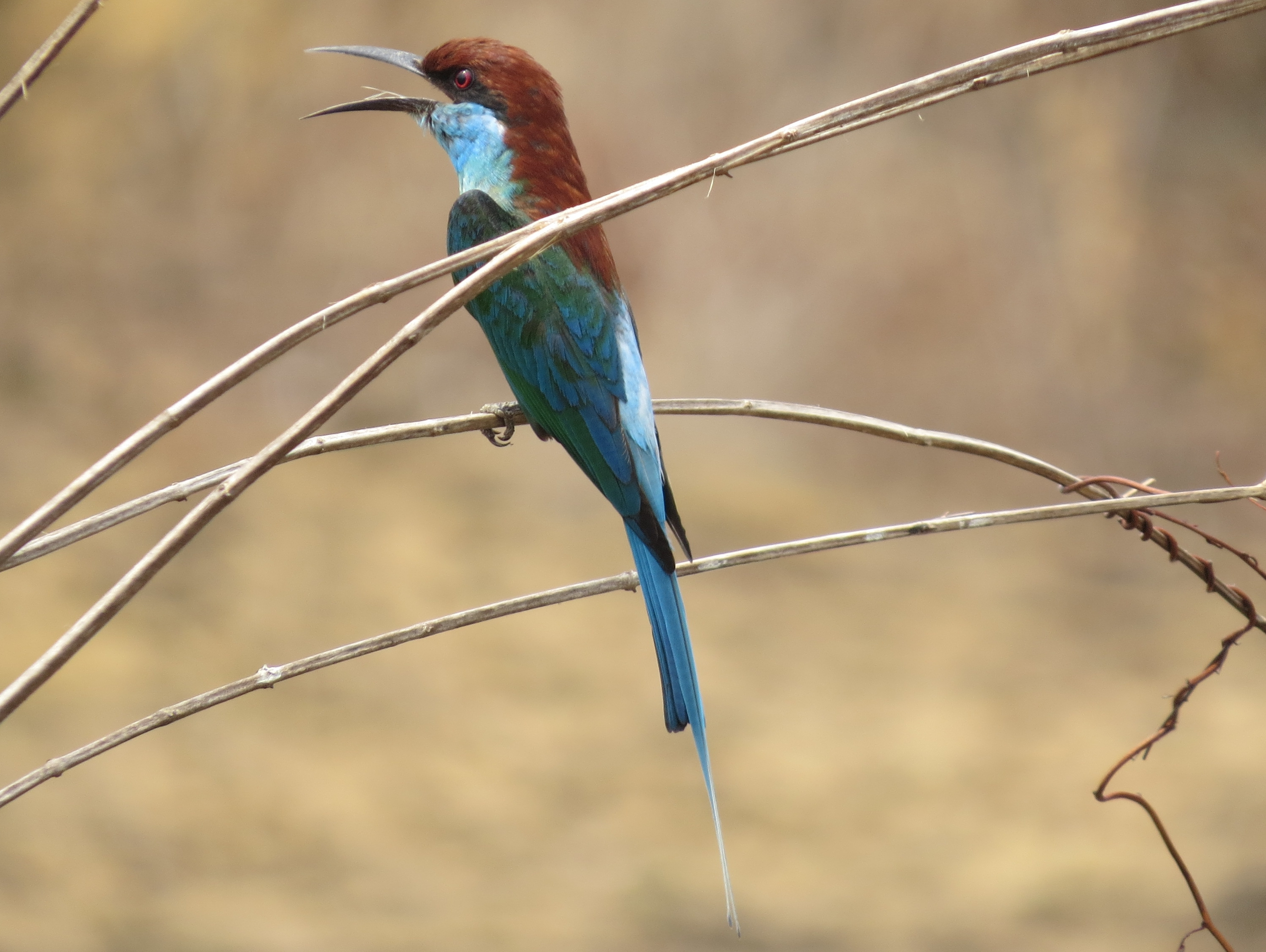
The vagrant blue-throated Bee-eater in Kerala, India

There is one record of vagrancy, a single in a blue-tailed bee-eater (Merops philippinus) colony near Kannur, Kerala, in southern India, from 26 May to 8 June 2013.

== Behaviour and ecology ==
=== Vocal behaviour ===
Blue-throated bee-eaters make a combination of calls characterised as long calls, alarm calls, chirps, low chirps, purrs, sharp coos, trills, and feeding calls. Long calls have been observed to communicate long distances and can be recognised by their volume and intensity. A long call is performed either during flight or on a perch by stretching and pointing their bill upwards, known as a "long call" posture. Chirps are short and sharp with regular intervals, often used during digs.

=== Breeding ===
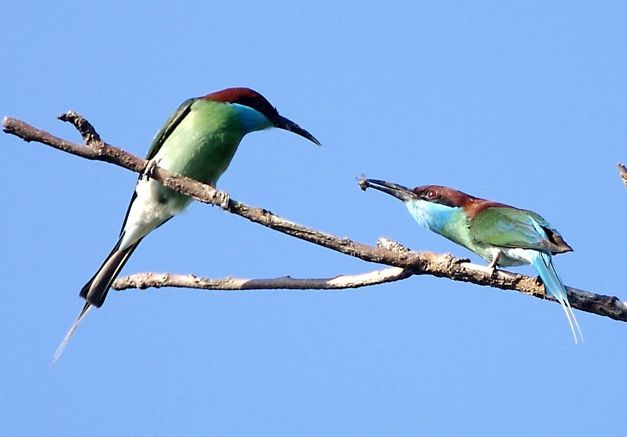
Courtship offering of an insect from male to female

There has been several observations of migration between islands in southeast Asia or to mainland of Asia. One notable seasonal spring migration occurs from Sumatra, across the Strait of Malacca, and ending on the west coast of Malaysia. They also migrate from southeast Asia to breeding grounds in southern China during breeding season.

Blue-throated bee-eaters have a generation rate of around 6.2 years. They practice asynchronous brooding, with the parents beginning incubation with the first egg laid. This results in hatching of chicks at different times. The eggs hatch over a period of ten days with an average spread of 4.43 ±12.15 days. The sequence and timing of the hatching of chicks is correlated with size, with the first-born chick having the greatest mass. Parents lay two to seven eggs with a survival of zero to three chicks raised to fledging. The chicks normally die in order, starting from youngest and smallest. The observed death rate in chicks was largely caused by sibling attacks by using a sharp hook on the upper bill, later lost in development, and inflicting wounds on the naked head of other chicks. Those chicks who are older have time to grow more contour feathers, protecting them from damaging attacks. Siblicide is common among other birds to increase the larger and older chick's survival with greater access to food by the parents. Sibling attacks are more common among birds when food is scarce and monopolized. In the blue-throated bee-eater's case, insects are delivered one by one to the chicks, making food given to chicks with the greater advantage. Increasing brood size did not increase the survival of the chicks. Decreasing body mass is correlated with increasing wounds and scars found on the individual chicks, which increased the likelihood of death.

=== Food and feeding ===
They predominantly feed on flying insects such as bees and wasps, though a large percentage of their diet consists of dragonflies, with highest success rate of their catches in sunny conditions. Other insects caught include flies, beetles, and other bugs up to 42mm. Observations found no feeding activities during rain and right after showers. Their feeding patterns are well-matched with the seasonal weather patterns. The highest feeding rate is during breeding season, perfectly matching the sunniest period, right after the rainy season.

== Relationship to humans ==
Humans act as a threat to blue-throated bee-eater habitats. The species has been listed as "least concern" in terms of conservational status, which is determined by a combination of range distribution, population stability, habitat loss, and potential threats; this was last assessed on 12 June 2024. Humans have impacted avian richness in the hill dipterocarp tropical rainforests in Malaysia. Logging and destruction of rainforests can impact not only individual bird species, but also the diversity of birds in the region. Diversity of species can bounce back within thirty years post-logging and was observed to have higher species richness in terms of bird diversity and numbers compared to recently logged forests.
