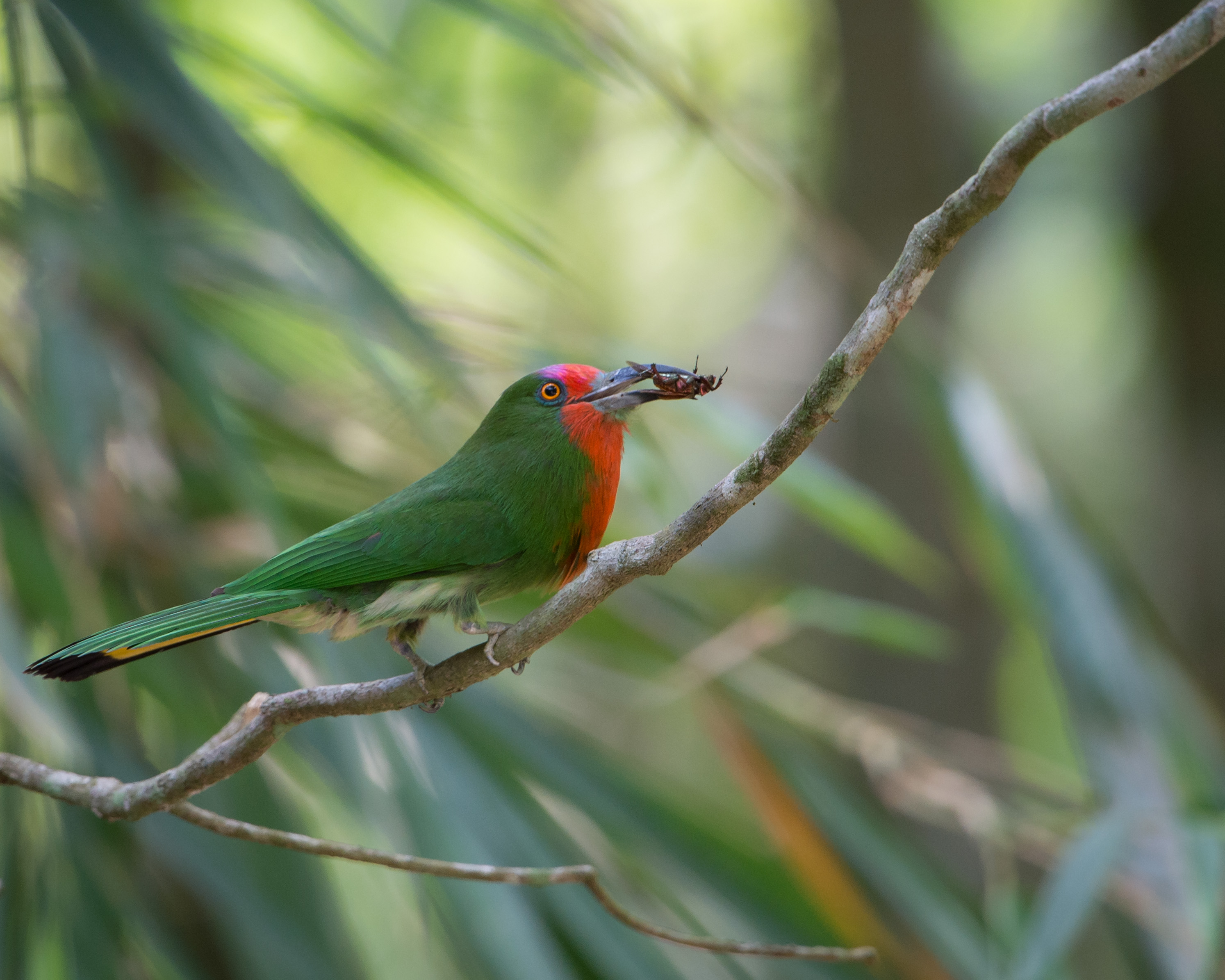

Conservation status
- Least Concern (IUCN 3.1)

Scientific classification
- Kingdom: Animalia
- Phylum: Chordata
- Class: Aves
- Order: Coraciiformes
- Family: Meropidae
- Genus: Nyctyornis
- Species: N. amictus

Binomial name
- Nyctyornis amictus (Temminck, 1824)

= Red-bearded bee-eater =

Species of bird

The red-bearded bee-eater (Nyctyornis amictus) is a large species of bee-eater found in southern Myanmar, the Thai-Malay Peninsula, Borneo, Sumatra and nearby smaller islands. This species is found in openings in patches of dense forest.

== Description ==
Like other bee-eaters, they are colourful birds with long tails, long decurved beaks and pointed wings. They are large bee-eaters, predominantly green, with a red colouration to face that extends on to the slightly hanging throat feathers to form the "beard". Their eyes are orange.

== Diet ==
Like other bee-eaters, they predominantly eat insects, especially bees, wasps and hornets, which are caught in flight from perches concealed in foliage. They hunt alone or in pairs, rather than in flocks, and sit motionless for long periods before pursuing their prey.

== Behaviour ==
Like other bee-eaters, they nest in burrows tunnelled into the side of sandy banks, but do not form colonies.
