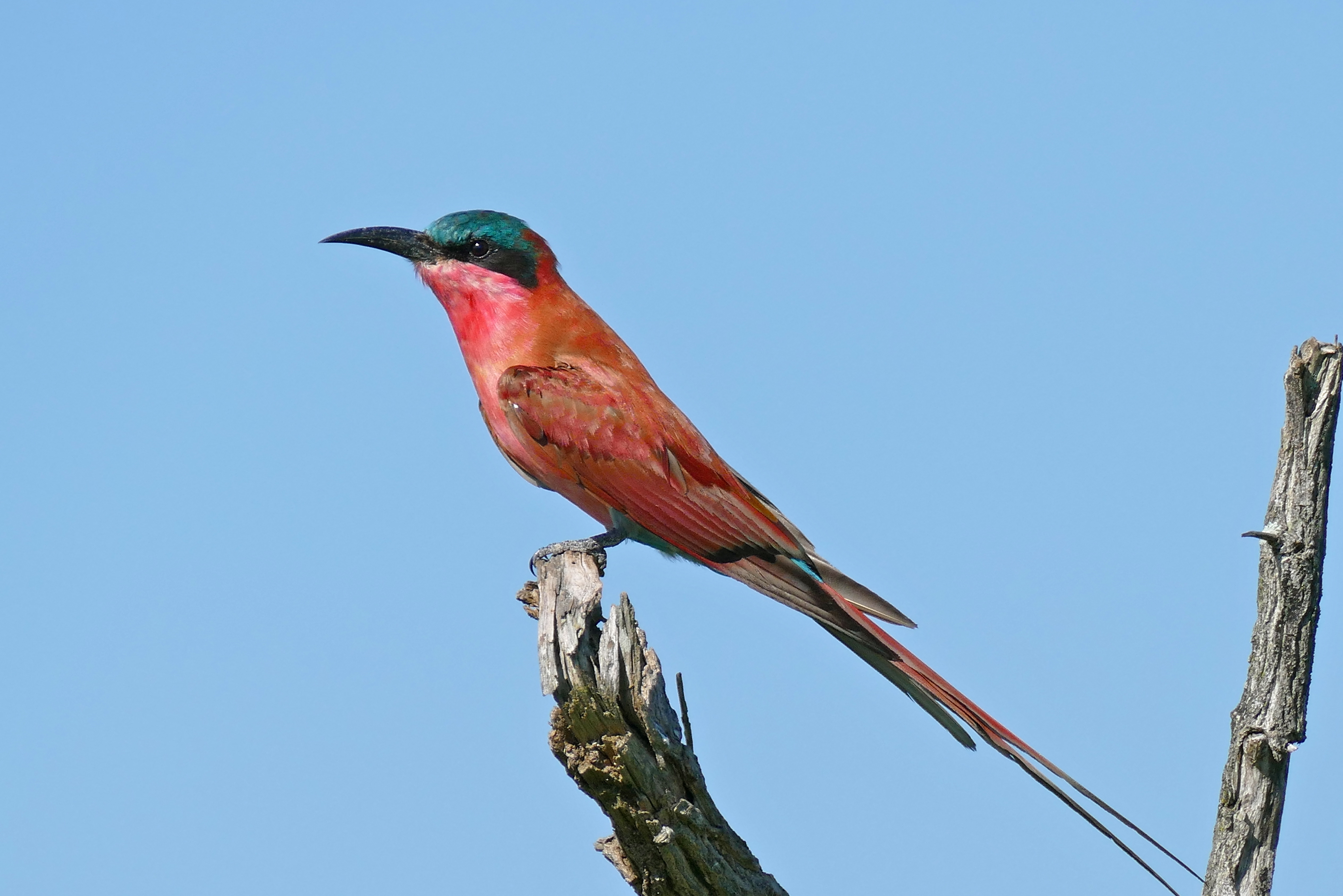

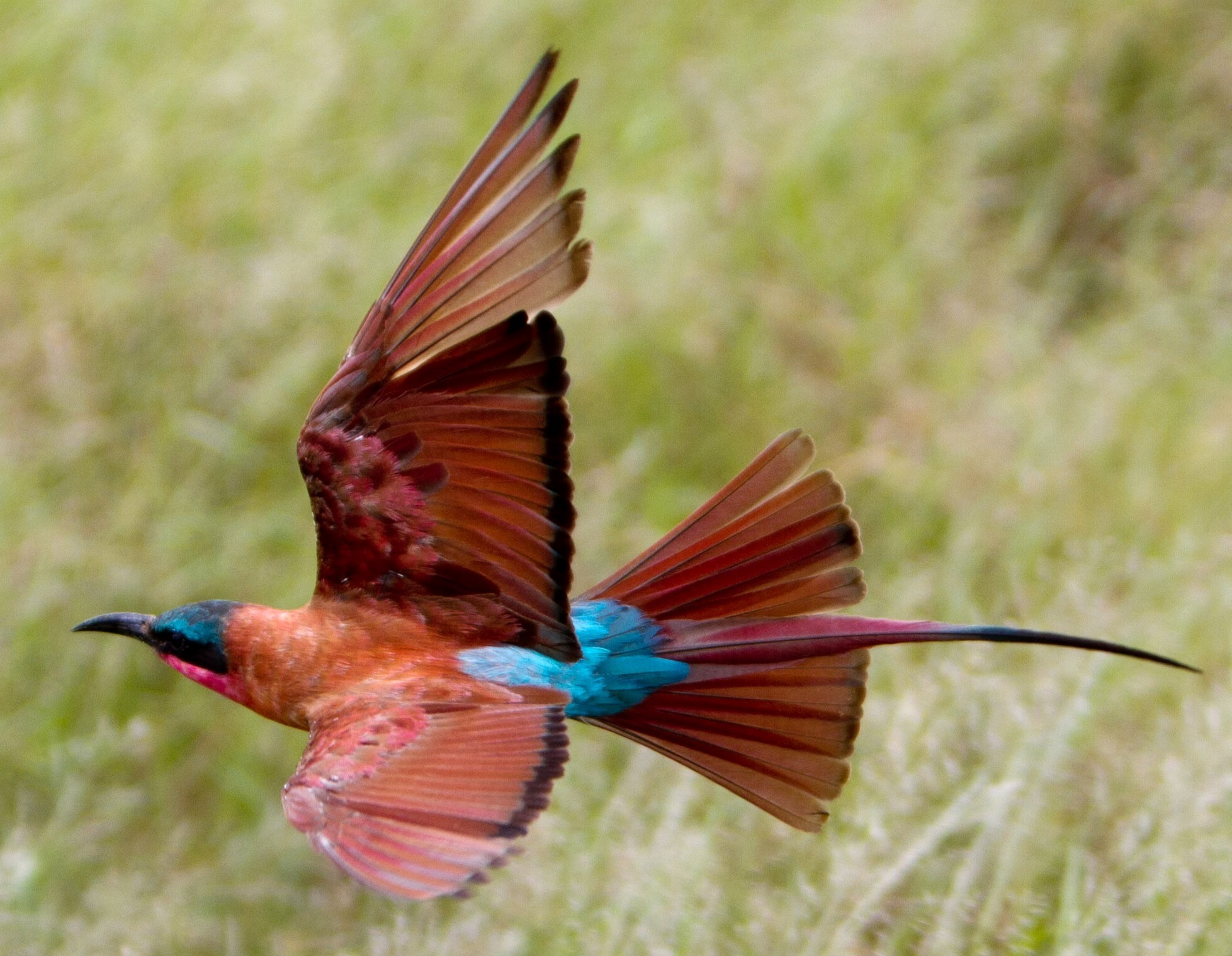

Conservation status
- Least Concern (IUCN 3.1)

Scientific classification
- Kingdom: Animalia
- Phylum: Chordata
- Class: Aves
- Order: Coraciiformes
- Family: Meropidae
- Genus: Merops
- Species: M. nubicoides

Binomial name
- Merops nubicoides Des Murs & Pucheran, 1846
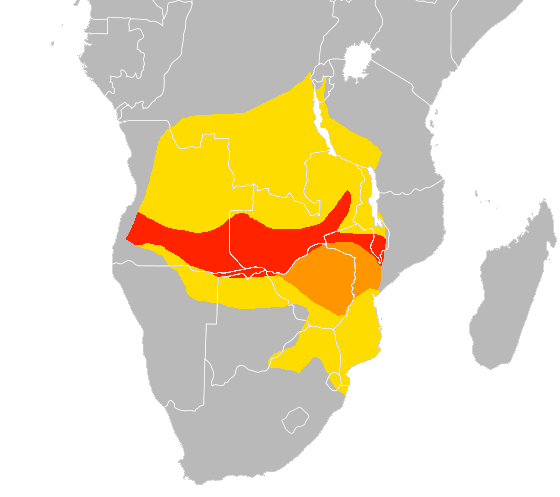
- year-round resident breeding visitor non-breeding visitor

= Southern carmine bee-eater =

Species of bird

The southern carmine bee-eater (Merops nubicoides) is a species of bee-eater found across sub-equatorial Africa. It was formerly considered conspecific with the closely related northern carmine bee-eater, with the combined species then known as carmine bee-eater.

== Description ==
This species, like other bee-eaters, is richly coloured and is predominantly carmine in colouration, but the crown and undertail are blue.

== Range and movements ==
The southern carmine bee-eater occurs from KwaZulu-Natal and Namibia to Gabon, the eastern Democratic Republic of the Congo and Kenya. The bee-eater is a migratory species, spending the breeding season, between August and November, in Zimbabwe and Zambia, before moving as far south as South Africa for the summer months, and then migrating to Equatorial Africa from March to August.

== Diet and foraging ==
Their diet is made up primarily of bees and other flying insects, and their major hunting strategy involves hawking flying insects from perch. Perches may include branches of vegetation or even the backs of large animals, such as the kori bustard. They are attracted to wildfires because of the flushed insects, and are often seen circling high in the air. They circle larger animals and even cars to catch the insects that are trying to escape.

== Habitat and breeding ==
Its usual habitat included low-altitude river valleys and floodplains, preferring vertical banks suitable for tunneling when breeding, but readily digging vertical burrows in the level surface of small salt islands. This is a highly sociable species, gathering in large flocks, in or out of breeding season. They roost communally in trees or reedbeds, and disperse widely during the day. Nesting is at the end of a 1 to 2 meter long burrow in an earthen bank, where they lay from 2 to 5 eggs.

== Gallery ==
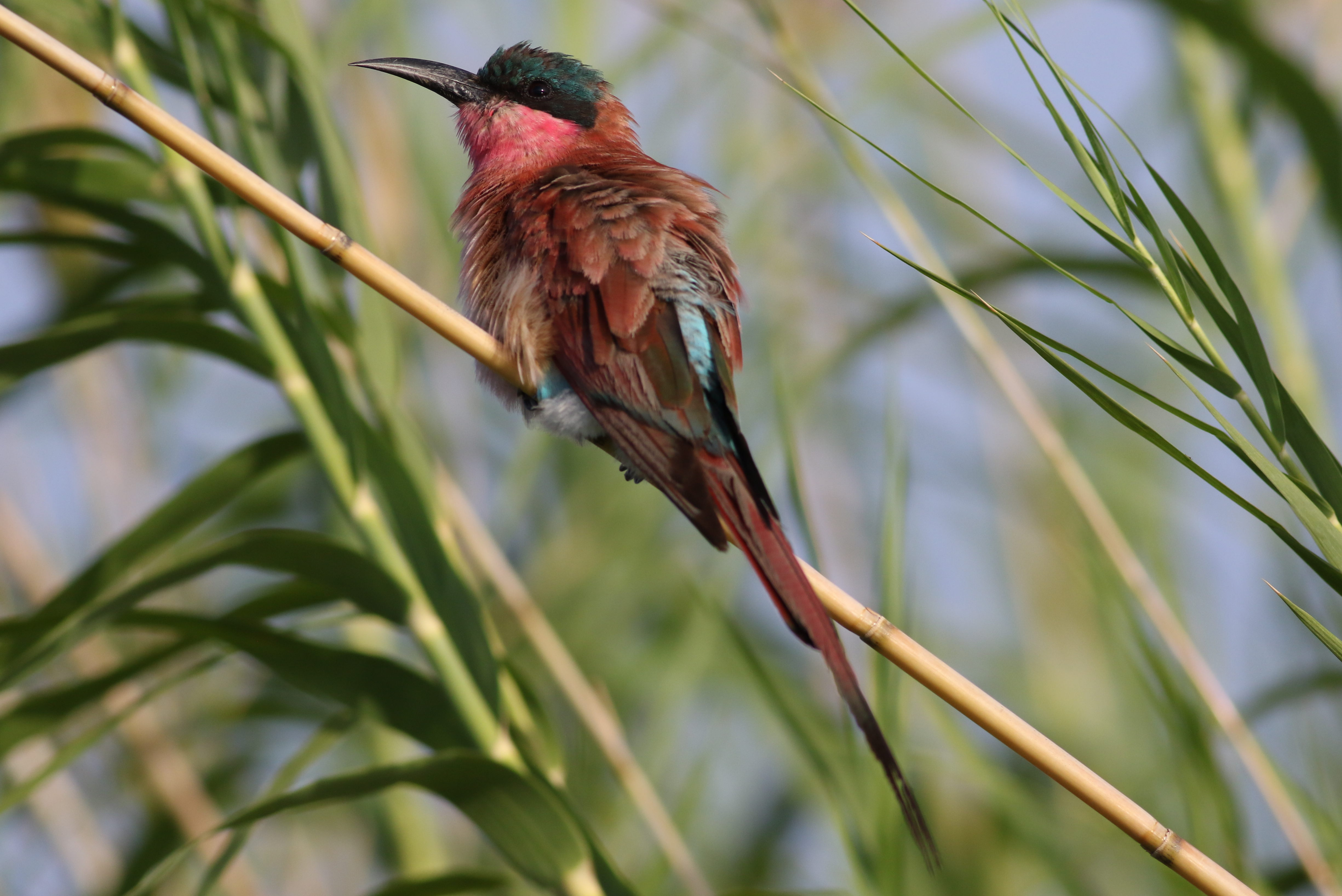
Roosting in Phragmites reedbed

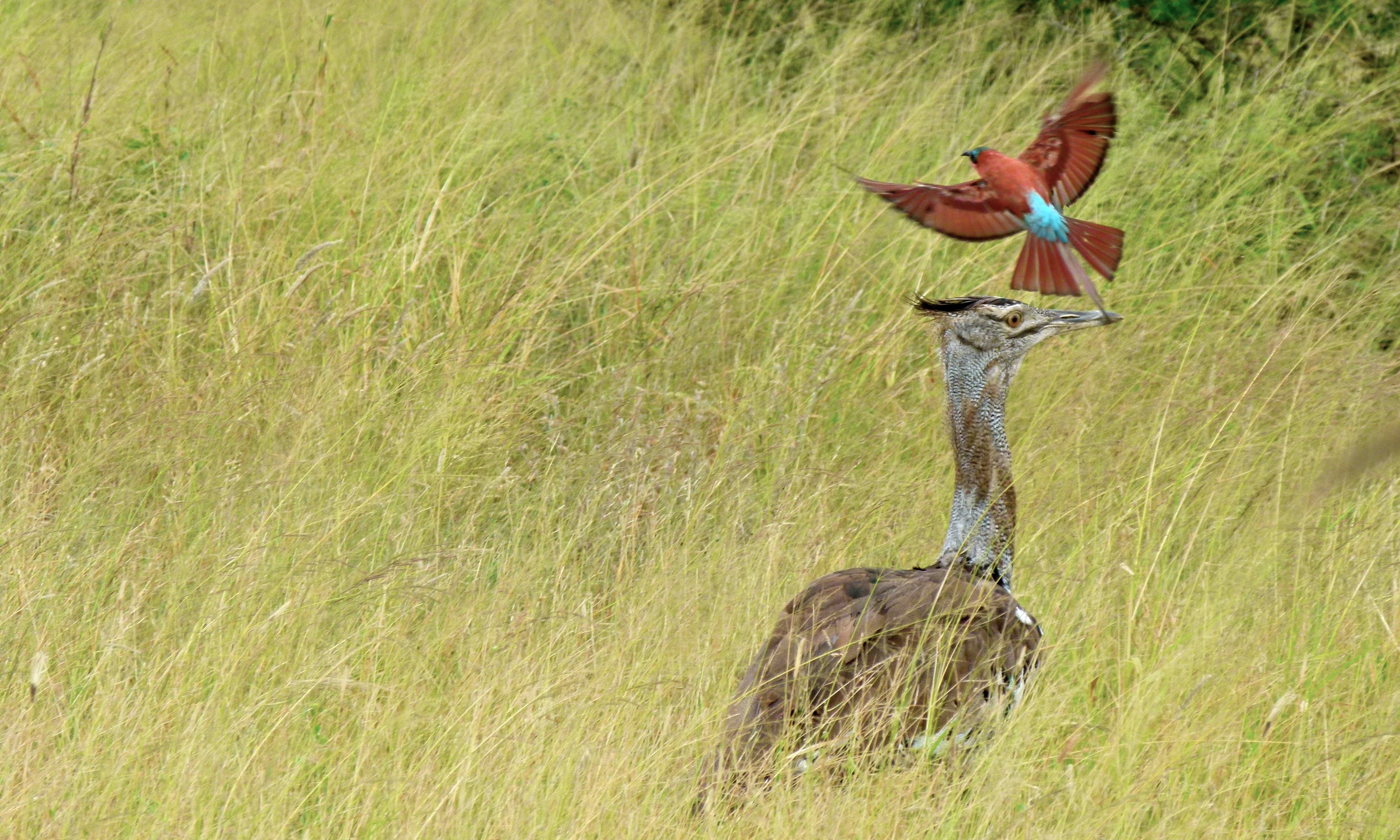
Hunting over a kori bustard

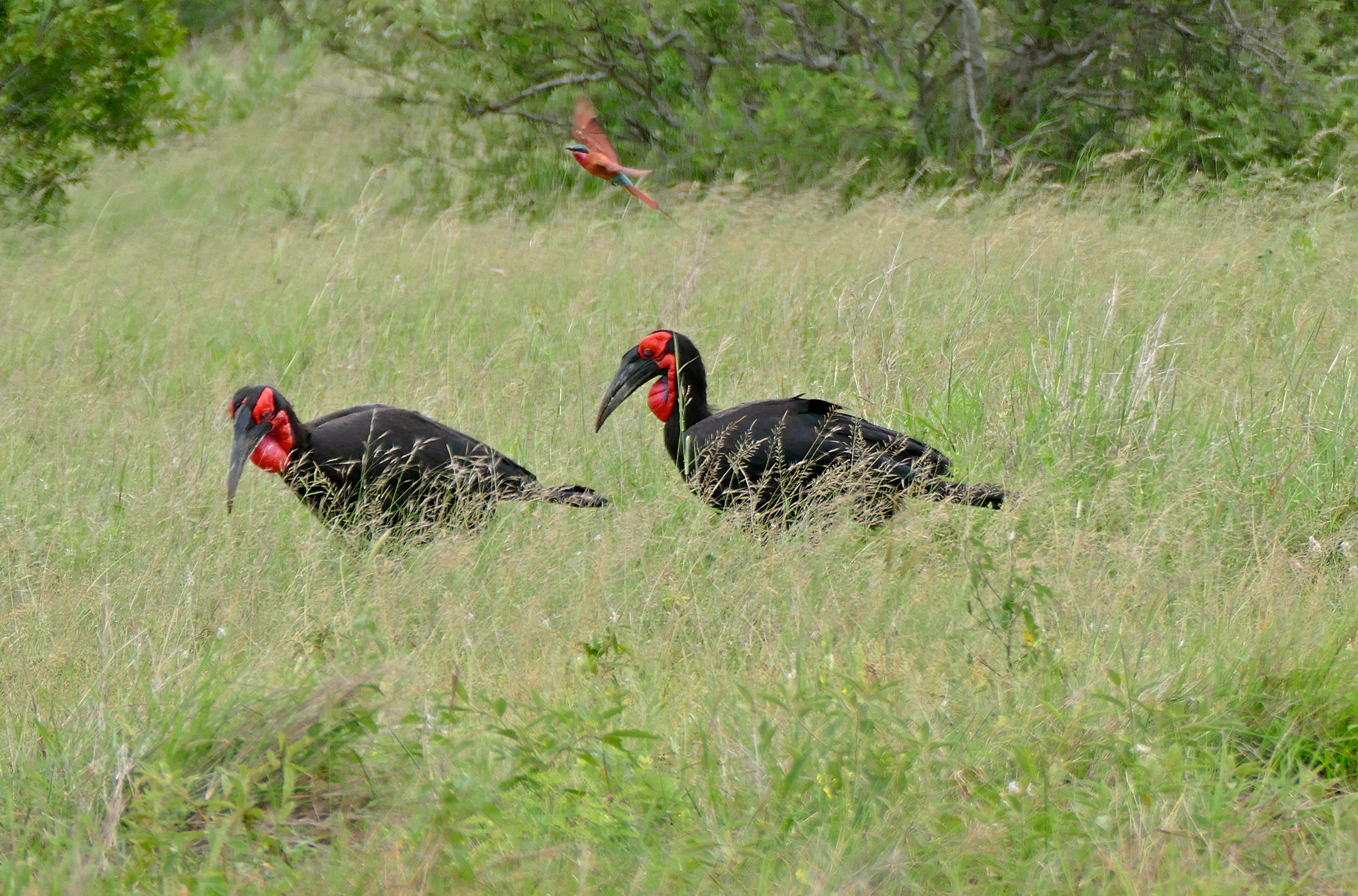
Hunting over a pair of ground hornbills

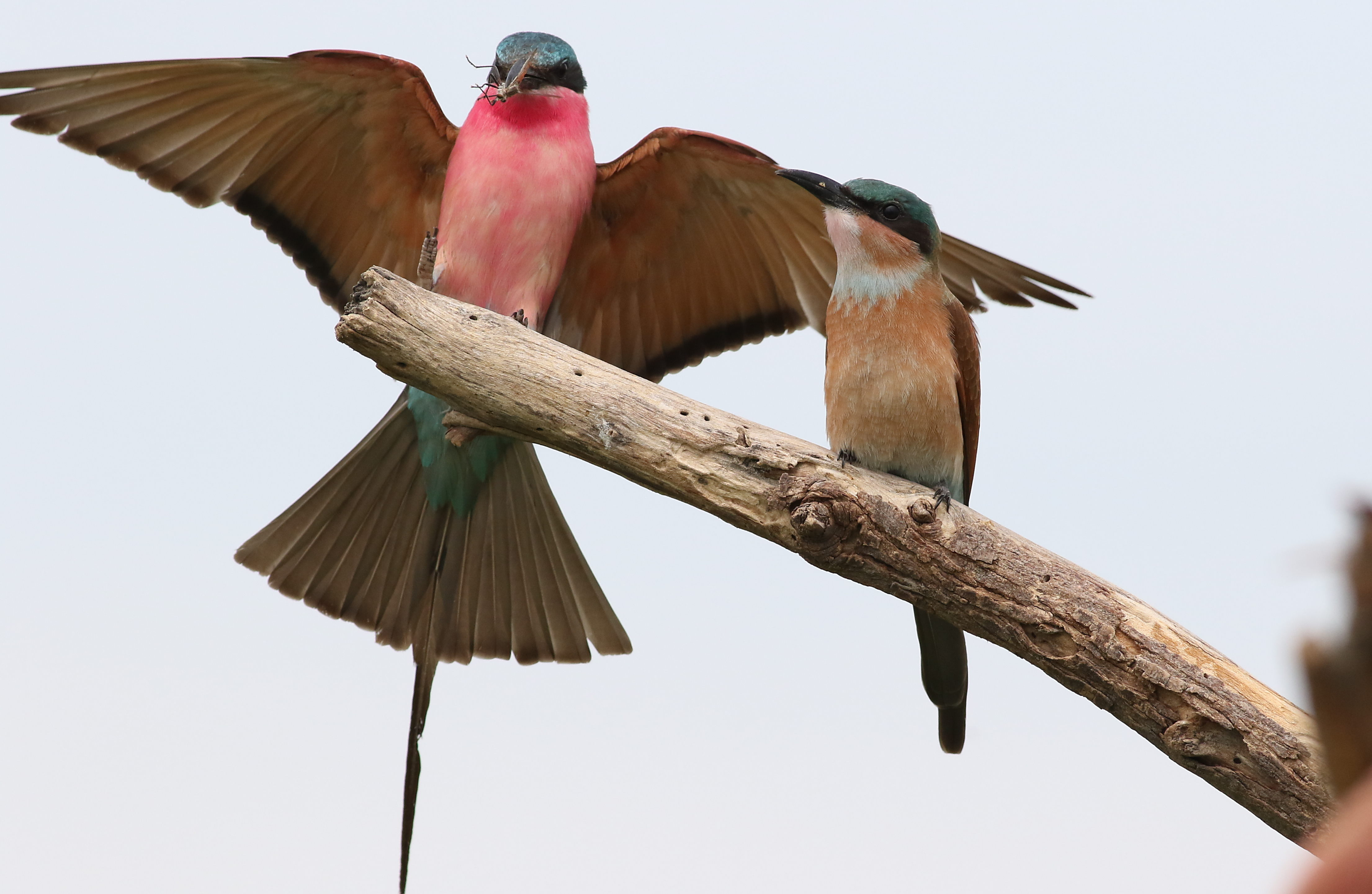
Adult with juvenile

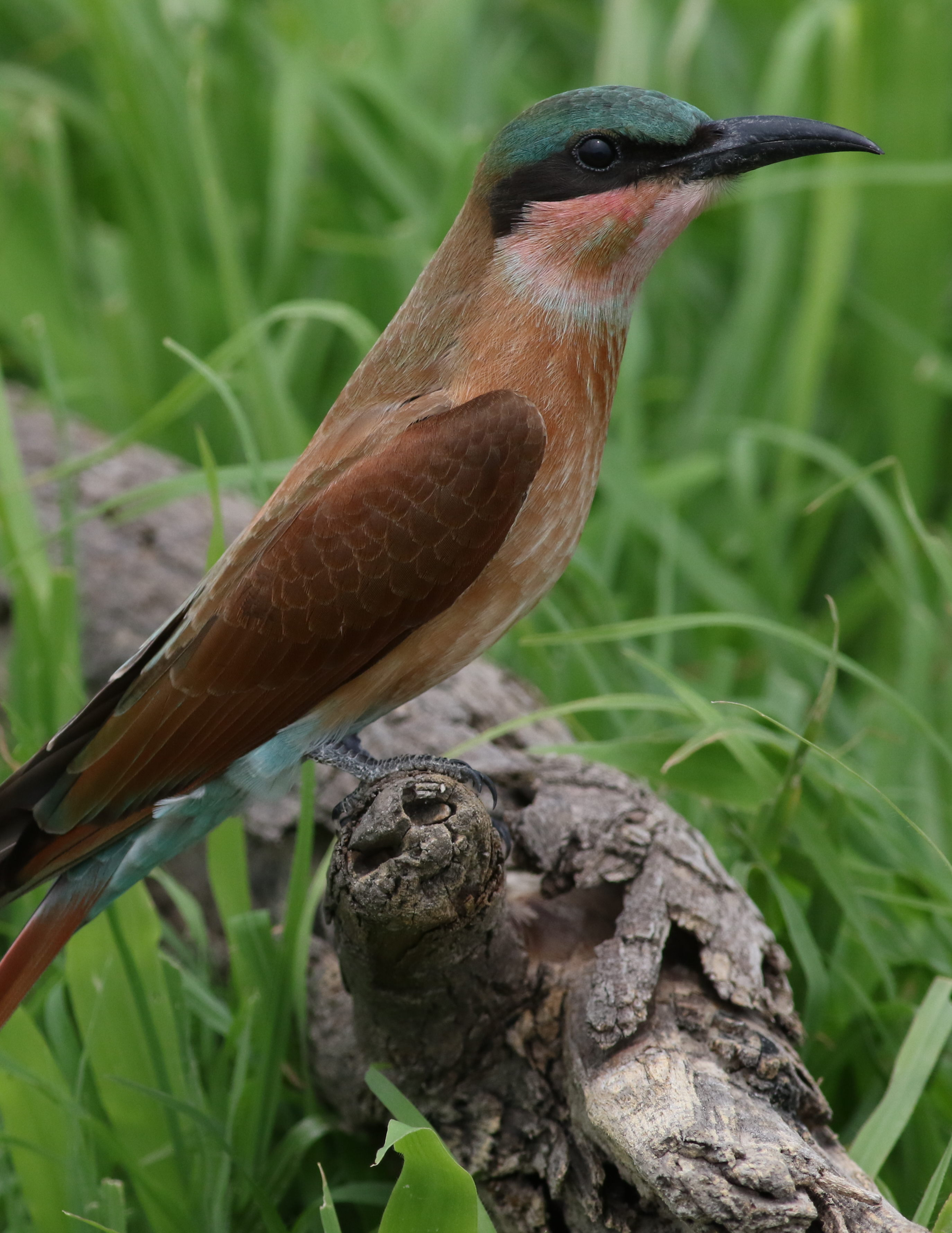
Juvenile plumage

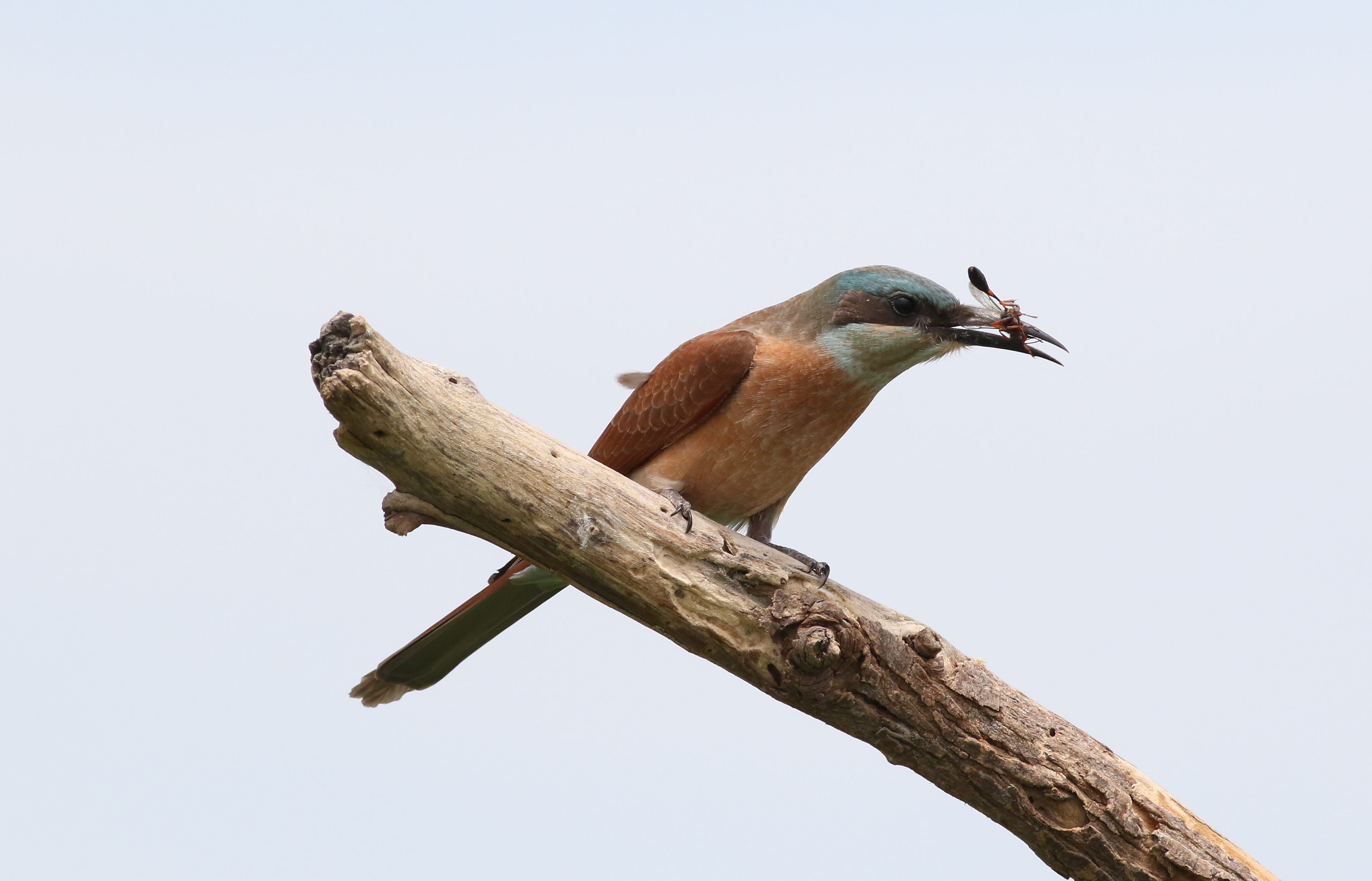
Juvenile with Belonogaster wasp prey
