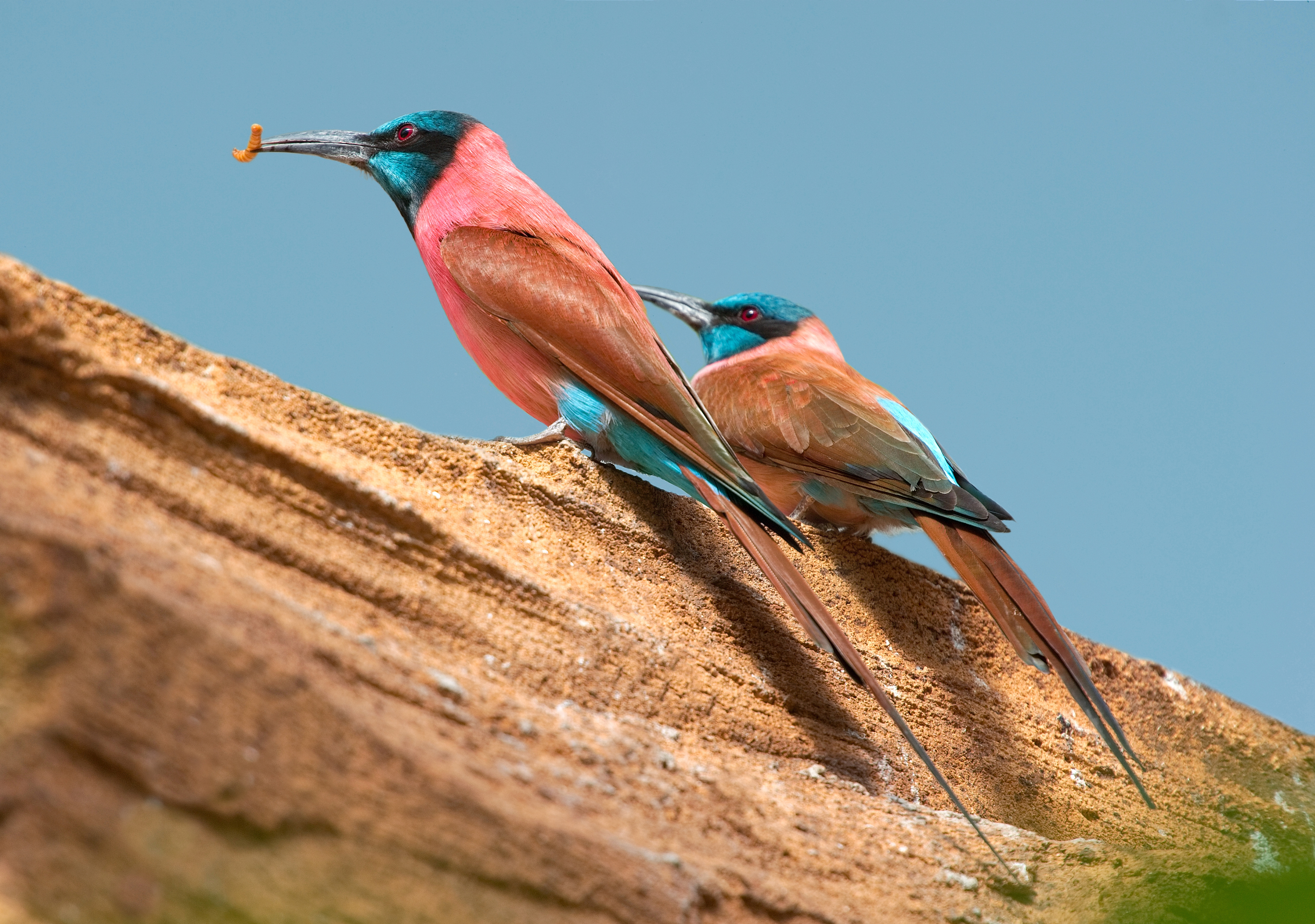

Conservation status
- Least Concern (IUCN 3.1)

Scientific classification
- Kingdom: Animalia
- Phylum: Chordata
- Class: Aves
- Order: Coraciiformes
- Family: Meropidae
- Genus: Merops
- Species: M. nubicus

Binomial name
- Merops nubicus Gmelin, JF, 1788

= Northern carmine bee-eater =

Species of bird

The northern carmine bee-eater (Merops nubicus) is a brightly-coloured bird in the bee-eater family, Meropidae. It is found across northern tropical Africa, from Senegal eastwards to Somalia, Ethiopia and Kenya. It was formerly considered to be conspecific with the southern carmine bee-eater which has a carmine coloured throat rather than the blue throat of the northern species.

== Taxonomy ==
The northern carmine bee-eater was formally described in 1788 by the German naturalist Johann Friedrich Gmelin in his revised and expanded edition of Carl Linnaeus's Systema Naturae. He placed it with the other bee-eaters in the genus Merops and coined the binomial name Merops nubicus. Gmelin based his description on "Le guépier rouge à tête bleu" or "Guépier de Nubie" that had been described and illustrated in 1779 by French polymath Comte de Buffon in his multi-volume book Histoire Naturelle des Oiseaux. Buffon had been provided with a picture drawn by the Scottish traveller and writer James Bruce who had visited Nubia in 1770–1771. It is monotypic: no subspecies are recognised. The northern carmine bee-eater was formerly treated as conspecific with the southern carmine bee-eater (Merops nubicoides).

== Description ==
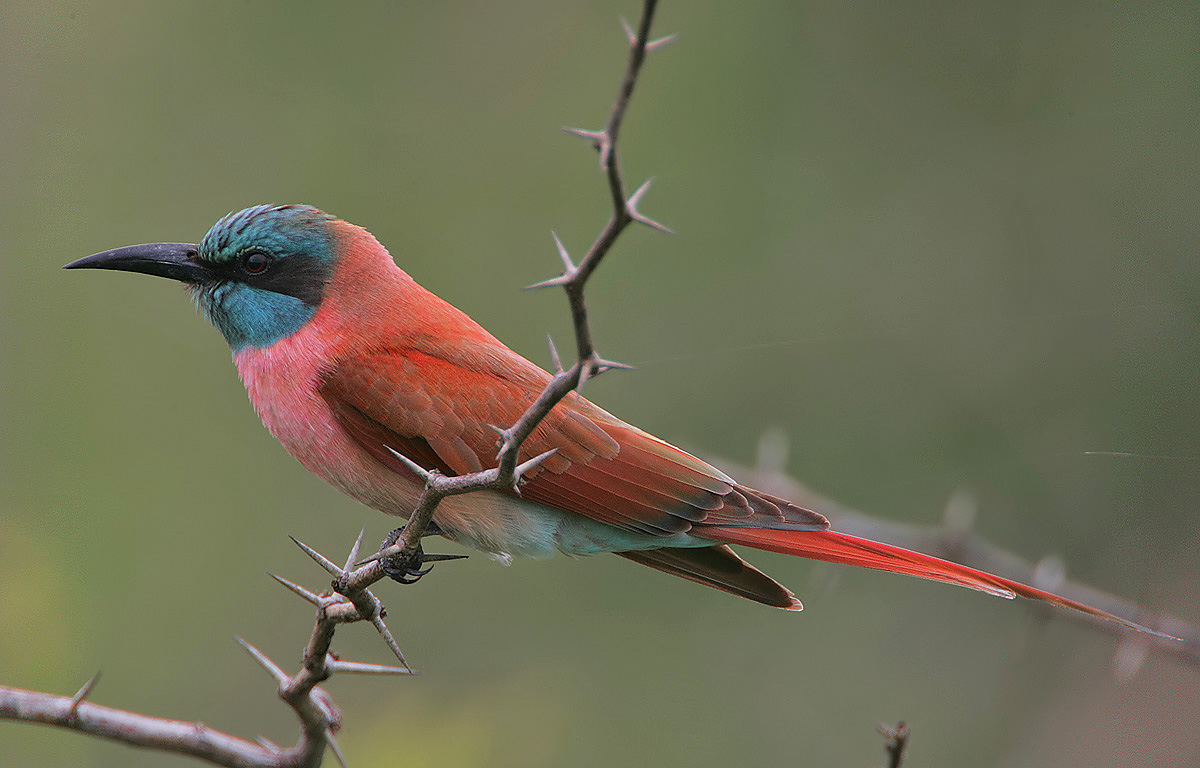
Near Watamu, Kenya

This species, like other bee-eaters, is a richly colored, slender bird, predominantly carmine in color, except for a greenish blue head and throat and distinctive black mask. This species has red eyes, a black, pointed, decurved beak, and elongated central tail feathers.

The sexes are similar in appearance, and the juveniles can be distinguished from adults by their lack of elongated central tail feathers and the pinkish brown coloration of their mantle, chest to belly, and flanks. The call is a deep, throaty tunk in flight; a series of rik notes when perched.

== Distribution ==
It is native to Benin, Burkina Faso, Cameroon, the Central African Republic, Chad, the Democratic Republic of the Congo, Côte d'Ivoire, Eritrea, Ethiopia, Gambia, Ghana, Guinea, Guinea-Bissau, Kenya, Liberia, Mali, Mauritania, Niger, Nigeria, Senegal, Sierra Leone, Somalia, Sudan, Tanzania, Togo and Uganda. It occurs as a vagrant in Burundi.

Sue McLaren and colleagues have suggested that the distribution of the northern carmine bee-eater is tightly linked to the presence of secondary loess deposits throughout Africa.

== Behavior ==
=== Breeding ===
They nest in large colonies in cliffs, usually near river banks, where they use their bills to dig long horizontal nesting tunnels, often eight feet or more in length. Some colonies may consist of just a few nests while others accommodate hundreds of breeding birds. The same site may be used for several years and then the colony may all move to another location. Occupied nests accumulate a black litter of insect remains and smell strongly of ammonia. Three to five eggs are laid per clutch.

=== Feeding ===
Their diet is made up primarily of bees and other flying insects, such as flying ants, grasshoppers and locusts. The main hunting strategy of bee-eaters is to keep watch for flying insects from a perch, and then snatch them out of the air using their beaks, before returning to the perch.

== Relationship with humans ==
The Northern carmine bee-eater once was on the banknote of 25 Dalasi in Gambia.
