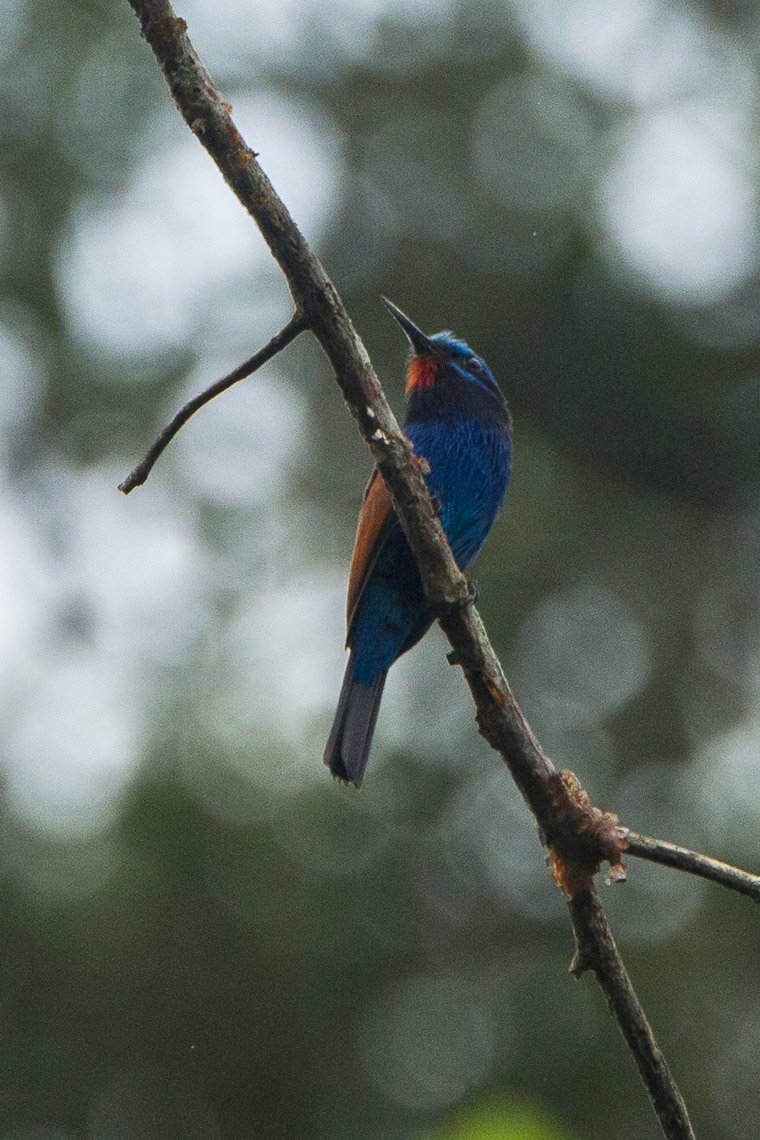

Conservation status
- Near Threatened (IUCN 3.1)

Scientific classification
- Kingdom: Animalia
- Phylum: Chordata
- Class: Aves
- Order: Coraciiformes
- Family: Meropidae
- Genus: Merops
- Species: M. mentalis

Binomial name
- Merops mentalis Cabanis, 1889

= Blue-moustached bee-eater =

Species of bird

The blue-moustached bee-eater (Merops mentalis) is a species of bird in the family Meropidae, a group of brightly colored Palearctic and Afrotropical birds noted for feeding primarily on venomous Hymenoptera such as bees and wasps. The blue-moustached bee-eater is one of 31 species within this family. It is a small, dark bee-eater measuring about 19 cm in length. Both sexes are generally similar in appearance, with predominantly purplish-blue plumage, a rich chestnut mantle, back, and wings.

The species is native to the Upper Guinean forests, the Western High Plateau and Bioko, and occurs in Cameroon, Ivory Coast, Equatorial Guinea, Ghana, Guinea, Liberia, Nigeria, and Sierra Leone, where it inhabits submontane and upland rainforest habitats.

The blue-moustached bee-eater is typically found singly and is most often seen perched high in the forest canopy beside tracks or clearings. From these perches, it swoops down to capture small insects, such as butterflies, honeybees and other flying arthropods before returning to its original perch.

== Taxonomy ==
The genus Merops was introduced by the Swedish naturalist Carl Linnaeus in 1758 in the tenth edition of his Systema Naturae. The name Merops is derived from the Ancient Greek word for "bee-eater". The blue-moustached bee-eater (Merops mentalis) was first described by Jean Cabanis in 1889. Formerly, M. mentalis was sometimes placed with M. gularis in the genus Meropiscus. It has also been classified with other small, rounded-winged bee-eaters lacking tail streamers in the genus Melittophagus.

The species was also formerly considered conspecific with the blue-headed bee-eater (Merops muelleri) but is now generally treated as a distinct, monotypic species. M. mentalis differs from M.muelleri in several morphological traits, including its blue (rather than black) moustachial stripe, darker blue crown lacking a white forecrown, greenish-blue (rather than blue) tail, paler blue underparts, and elongated central tail feathers that are narrower and blunt-ended. A zone of intergradation between the two species occurs between Cross River, in Nigeria, and Douala, in Cameroon.

Most modern authorities, including the HBW and Birdlife International Taxonomic Checklist, the Clements Checklist, the Howard and Moore Complete Checklist, and the IOC World Bird List, recognize Merops mentalis as a separate species.

== Description ==
The blue-moustached bee-eater measures about 19 cm in length with tail streamers up to 3 cm more. Adults are predominantly purplish-blue, with a rich chestnut mantle, back, and wings. A small scarlet throat patch, bordered by black, is sometimes difficult to distinguish in light. Especially in flight, the entire wing appears rufous from direct or transmitted sunlight. The species has a black bill, red eyes, and grey legs and feet. Both sexes are generally similar in appearance, with males having more intense coloration, including a brighter cinnamon back, a darker blue ventral region, a darker red throat, and being slightly larger overall. Juveniles appear duskier than adults.

== Distribution and habitat ==
The blue-moustached bee-eater is found in West Africa, occurring in Sierra Leone, south-eastern Guinea, Liberia, Côte d'Ivoire, southern Ghana, southern Nigeria and western Cameroon. They are typically observed in clearings and along the edges of primary and old secondary forests, suggesting a strong association with mature forest habitats. The species also forages over agricultural land, with presence of large trees, either living or dead.

It prefers evergreen and semi-evergreen forests with a broken canopy and small clearings and is frequently found near forest edges along roads and near swamps. Despite this apparent tolerance for limited habitat disturbance, M. mentalis still relies on areas of intact forest and is generally absent from tree crops and farmbush. Individuals are usually seen in pairs or small family groups.

The species is non-migratory and occurs at elevations from 0 to 1,200 m, inhabiting rainforests where it tends to exist at low densities, even within protected areas. It has been recorded at elevations of up to 800 m in Ghana (Atewa Range), at similar elevations on Mount Nimba in Liberia, and up to 1,200 m on Bioko Island.

== Behavior ==
=== Vocalization ===
Not known differences from M. muelleri. The vocalizations of blue-moustached bee-eaters are generally infrequent and quiet, producing a high-pitched tinkling or squeaky "tsee-sup". Occasional contact calls between perched birds (distant or side-by-side) are a quiet "sip" or almost disyllabic "s(l)ip". When disturbed, birds may give an annoyance call, described as "slip-slip" followed by a short trill. Netted birds in separate cloth bags have been observed to utter muffled monosyllabic noises, resembling the contact call of undisturbed Red-throated Bee-eaters (Merops bulocki) in the nest at night. A woodpecker-like trill "trijiitriiii" has also been reported. This species usually does not call when assembling for or flying to roost.

=== Diet and Feeding ===
The blue-moustached bee-eater has a diet very similar to that of M. muelleri, feeding primarily on small insects and flying arthropods, with butterflies being common prey in Sierra Leone. It typically forages from lianas or thin bare branches, making short, fly-catching sallies from the mid-strata of the forest, though occasionally from lower perches or up to 15 m above ground. Usually observed in pairs or small family groups.

Following the breeding season, bee-eaters often disperse from nesting sites as food resources decline due to seasonal climatic conditions. During this period, they may move into cultivated areas, including agricultural fields and settlements, where insect abundance remains relatively high. In such areas, particularly near beekeeping farms, bee-eaters have been reported to feed on honeybees and may occasionally be considered pests.

=== Mating and Reproduction ===
The breeding behavior of the blue-moustached bee-eater is poorly known. However, studies on related species within the genus Merops indicate that their reproductive cycles generally occur between April and August, primarily within natural landscapes such as savannas and open forests.

Fledglings of blue-moustached bee-eaters have been observed in February in Sierra Leone and Ghana, and in March in Ivory Coast, while nestlings have been reported in February in Cameroon. Eggs have been reported in January in Cameroon and in early March in Liberia. In Liberia, young at various stages of dependence have been observed between March to June.

The species excavates a burrow approximately 40–55 cm long, in roadside banks, the sides of sawyer's pit on the forest floor, or in soil raised around the roots of large trees. The clutch consists of two cream-white eggs, measuring about 22.5-23.7 mm × 18-20.1 mm. No further information on breeding has been reported.

== Conservation status ==
The blue-moustached bee-eater is currently listed as Near Threatened on the IUCN Red List. This species is believed to be undergoing a moderately rapid population decline, primarily due to habitat loss within its range.

In Liberia, large areas of forest are under increasing pressure from commercial logging, settlement expansion, and smallholder agriculture. Across the Upper Guinea region, remaining forest fragments face similar threats, including logging and agricultural conversion. Even within some reserves, forests are being cleared for teak plantations, cultivation, and illegal logging in Ghana's Opro River, Afram Headwaters, Tano Ofin, and Atewa Range Areas.

Between 2001 and 2019, the species' range experienced an estimated 16% loss of forest cover. Assuming population trends decline at a similar rate, this corresponds to an approximate 9% decline over three generations, placing the suspected past rate of decline within the 1-15% range. Between 2016 and 2019, a further 7.2% forest loss was recorded. Projected forward over three generations, this equates to a potential rate of 22% population decline, placing the suspected future rate of decline in the 20-29% range.
