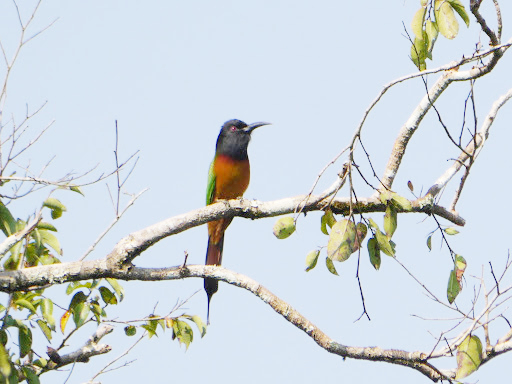

Conservation status
- Least Concern (IUCN 3.1)

Scientific classification
- Kingdom: Animalia
- Phylum: Chordata
- Class: Aves
- Order: Coraciiformes
- Family: Meropidae
- Genus: Merops
- Species: M. breweri

Binomial name
- Merops breweri (Cassin, 1859)

= Black-headed bee-eater =

Species of bird

The black-headed bee-eater (Merops breweri) is a species of bird in the family Meropidae. It is found in forests in tropical Central and West Africa, its range including Angola, Central African Republic, Republic of the Congo, Democratic Republic of the Congo, Ivory Coast, Gabon, Ghana, Nigeria, and South Sudan.

== Description ==
The adult black-headed bee-eater is between 25 and 28 cm (10 and 11 in) in length, excluding the 8 cm (3 in) tail streamers. The sexes are similar and it is a distinctive bird with a black head, green back, wings and tail, and buff breast and belly, with a rufous band across the lower breast. The juvenile has a black chin and throat. The only other bee-eaters living in forests within its range are the black bee-eater (Merops gularis) and the blue-headed bee-eater (Merops muelleri), and these have different colourings and are considerably smaller. The black-headed bee-eater is a bold bird and easy to approach, when the red eye can be seen. In flight, the tail shows green feathers at the centre and rufous feathers at the edges.

== Ecology ==
The black-headed bee-eater usually occurs as a solitary bird, as part of a pair or a trio, or after the breeding season, as part of a family group. About half of the diet is made up of honey bees, carpenter bees and other hymenopteran species, the remaining part being beetles, dragonflies, butterflies, moths and cicadas. It is nearly invisible as it sits on a perch in the mid-storey of the forest, but is easily observed as it darts out to snap up some passing insect in flight.

== Status ==
The black-headed bee-eater has a very wide range but is an uncommon bird. The population is thought to be declining because of such factors as the snaring of birds and the blocking up of nesting holes. However the total population size is large and the decline trend is slow, so the International Union for Conservation of Nature has assessed the conservation trend of this bird as being of "least concern".
