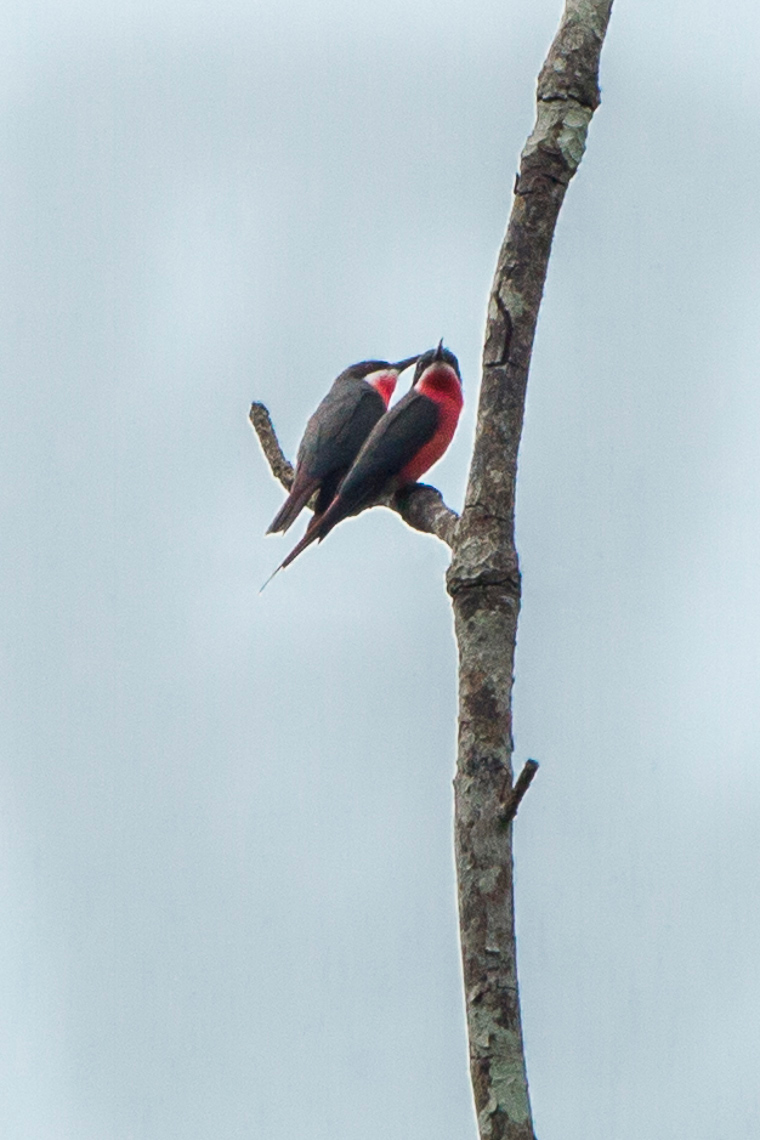

Conservation status
- Least Concern (IUCN 3.1)

Scientific classification
- Kingdom: Animalia
- Phylum: Chordata
- Class: Aves
- Order: Coraciiformes
- Family: Meropidae
- Genus: Merops
- Species: M. malimbicus

Binomial name
- Merops malimbicus Shaw, 1806

= Rosy bee-eater =

Species of bird

The rosy bee-eater (Merops malimbicus) is a species of bird in the family Meropidae. It is found in Angola, Benin, Burkina Faso, Republic of the Congo, Democratic Republic of the Congo, Ivory Coast, Equatorial Guinea, Gabon, Ghana, Nigeria, and Togo.

== Taxonomy ==
English naturalist George Shaw first described the rosy bee-eater in 1806 as Merops malimbicus. This type of locality being from Malimbe, Cabinda in Angola. Molecular studies suggest that this species is most closely related to the white-throated bee-eater (Merops albicollis) and the northern carmine bee-eater (M. nubicus).

== Description ==
The adult is a distinctively colored bird that grows to a length of 22 to 25 cm (9 to 10 in) with tail-streamers adding 5 cm (2 in) to this, and weighing about 45 g (1.6 oz). Both sexes have similar features. The forehead and crown are dark grey, the mask black and the chin and cheek are white. The mantle is black, the wings and back are slate-grey and the rump paler grey. The tail is carmine, gradually bleaching to grey. The throat and underparts are bright pink and the undertail coverts are grey. The undersides of the flight feathers and large tail feathers are glossy black. The beak is black, the eye reddish-brown and the leg yellowish-brown. The juvenile is similar in coloring but paler, many of the smaller feathers having pale edges.

== Ecology ==
Like other bee-eaters, the species feeds on insects that it catches by swooping from a perch or hawking in the air. It forages in various habitats; close to the surface of water bodies, over savannas and woodlands, as well as above the canopies of forests, sometimes ascending to considerable heights. A large part of their diet is flying ants, but these birds also feed on bees, butterflies, dragonflies, grasshoppers, flies and beetles. Foraging flocks may be very large and birds may dip into the water during flight to bathe. Nesting takes place on raised beaches and sandbars of large rivers exposed by falling water levels. Holes are dug with the feet and passages may be 2 m (7 ft) or so long. Only a few colonies are known but these may be very large, with estimated nest counts of 8,000 to 27,300 or more, and a density of about two nesting holes per square metre. The colony may nest in the same location the following year but the nests that have been inundated during the rainy season need to be re-excavated.
