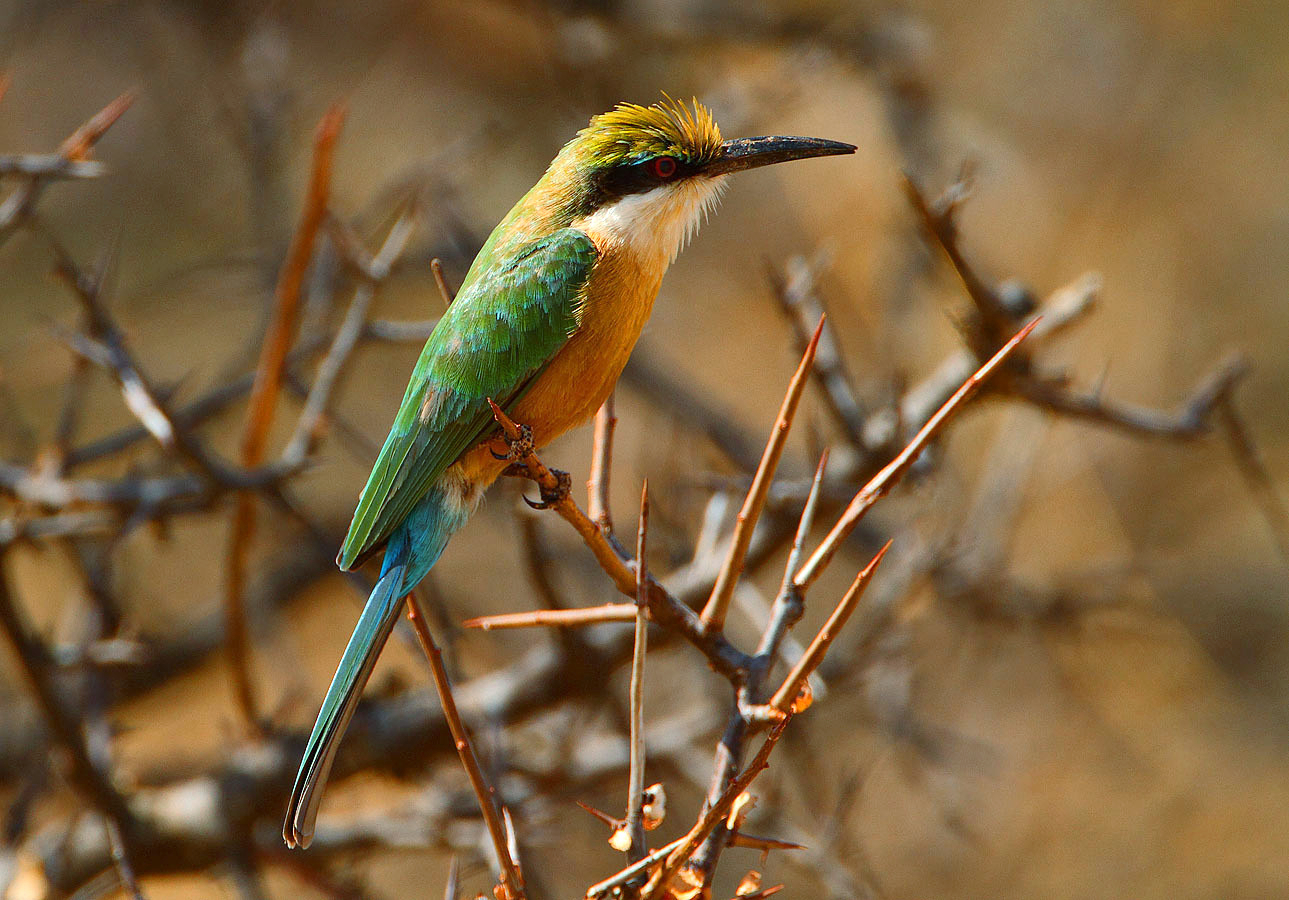

Conservation status
- Least Concern (IUCN 3.1)

Scientific classification
- Kingdom: Animalia
- Phylum: Chordata
- Class: Aves
- Order: Coraciiformes
- Family: Meropidae
- Genus: Merops
- Species: M. revoilii

Binomial name
- Merops revoilii Oustalet, 1882

= Somali bee-eater =

Species of bird

The Somali bee-eater (Merops revoilii) is a species of bird in the family Meropidae. It is found in Ethiopia, Kenya, Saudi Arabia, Somalia and Tanzania. This is a small bee-eater that prefers arid country and desert areas where it may be locally common. The International Union for Conservation of Nature has assessed its conservation status as being of "least concern", postulating that clearing of woodland and forest is creating new suitable habitat for the bird and that its population trend may therefore be rising.

== Description ==
The Somali bee-eater grows to a length of 16 to 18 cm (6.3 to 7.1 in) and is the smallest member of the genus. The sexes are similar in appearance and are slender birds with spiky plumage on the head. The crown is glossy green and the eyebrow blue. The upper parts of the body are varying shades of green, the lower back and rump are bright blue and the tail is bluish-green. The cheeks, chin and throat are white, and the breast and belly cinnamon-buff. The beak is black, the eyes reddish-brown and the legs dark grey. This species lacks the dark trailing edges to the wings that many other members of the genus have.

== Distribution and habitat ==
The Somali bee-eater is found in the Horn of Africa, its range extending from the southern part of Ethiopia, through Somalia to northern and eastern Kenya. Its typical habitat is open scrub of Acacia and Commiphora, arid grassland with scattered bushes and steppe.

== Ecology ==
The Somali bee-eater feeds on small flying insects which it catches in short dashes from a low perch. It is either solitary or found in pairs. It nests in the banks of road cuttings and in the sides of deep wells. In Kenya it breeds between March and June.
