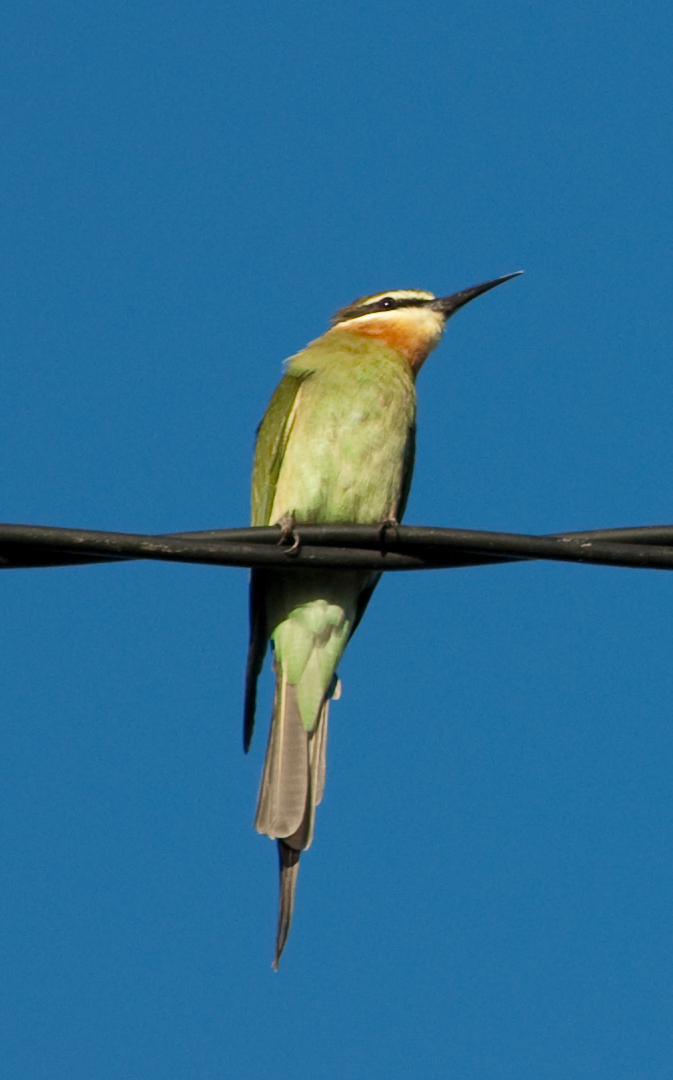

Conservation status
- Least Concern (IUCN 3.1)

Scientific classification
- Kingdom: Animalia
- Phylum: Chordata
- Class: Aves
- Order: Coraciiformes
- Family: Meropidae
- Genus: Merops
- Species: M. superciliosus

Binomial name
- Merops superciliosus Linnaeus, 1766

= Olive bee-eater =

Species of bird

The olive bee-eater or Madagascar bee-eater (Merops superciliosus) is a bee-eater species in the genus Merops. It is native to the southern half of Africa where it is present in Angola; Botswana; Burundi; Comoros; Democratic Republic of the Congo; Djibouti; Eritrea; Ethiopia; Kenya; Madagascar; Malawi; Mayotte; Mozambique; Namibia; Rwanda; Somalia; South Sudan; Sudan; Tanzania; Uganda; Zambia; Zimbabwe. It is a common species with a wide range so the International Union for Conservation of Nature has rated their conservation status as "least concern".

== Taxonomy ==
In 1760 the French zoologist Mathurin Jacques Brisson included a description of the olive bee-eater in his Ornithologie based on a specimen collected on the island of Madagascar. He used the French name Le guespier de Madagascar and the Latin Apiaster Madagascariensis. Although Brisson coined Latin names, these do not conform to the binomial system and are not recognised by the International Commission on Zoological Nomenclature. When in 1766 the Swedish naturalist Carl Linnaeus updated his Systema Naturae for the twelfth edition, he added 240 species that had been previously described by Brisson. One of these was the olive bee-eater. Linnaeus included a brief description, coined the current binomial name Merops superciliosus and cited Brisson's work. The specific name superciliosus is Latin for "supercilious", "haughty" or "eye-browed".

Two subspecies are recognised:

- M. s. superciliosus Linnaeus, 1766 – east Africa, Madagascar and the Comoro Islands
- M. s. alternans Clancey, 1971 – west Angola and northwest Namibia

== Description ==
The olive bee-eater grows to a length of 23 to 26 cm (9.1 to 10.2 in) with its tail streamers adding up to 7 cm (2.8 in). The sexes are similar, and adults have bronzy-green plumage with an olive cap and white forehead, eyebrows, chin and cheeks. The rump and tail are blue, apart from the streamers, which are black.

== Distribution ==
The olive bee-eater is found in the grassland and coastal mountain forests of East Africa and Madagascar, and an isolated population can be found in coastal Angola. There are two subspecies; M. s. superciliosus occurs in eastern Ethiopia, Somalia and Kenya, and southwards through East Africa to southern Mozambique and the Zambezi Valley, as well as the Comoro Islands and Madagascar; M. s. alternans occurs in western Angola and northwestern Namibia.

== Ecology ==
They are partially migratory, and usually breed only in the southern portion of their range, moving north for the dry season in southern Africa. It lays four eggs in a burrow nest at the beginning of the southern African wet season, and the chicks usually hatch at the beginning of December. Unlike most bee-eaters, the species does not practice cooperative breeding and post-fledging dependence is only around 19 days, which is typical of temperate zone passerines and about half that of most Meropidae species.

== Gallery ==
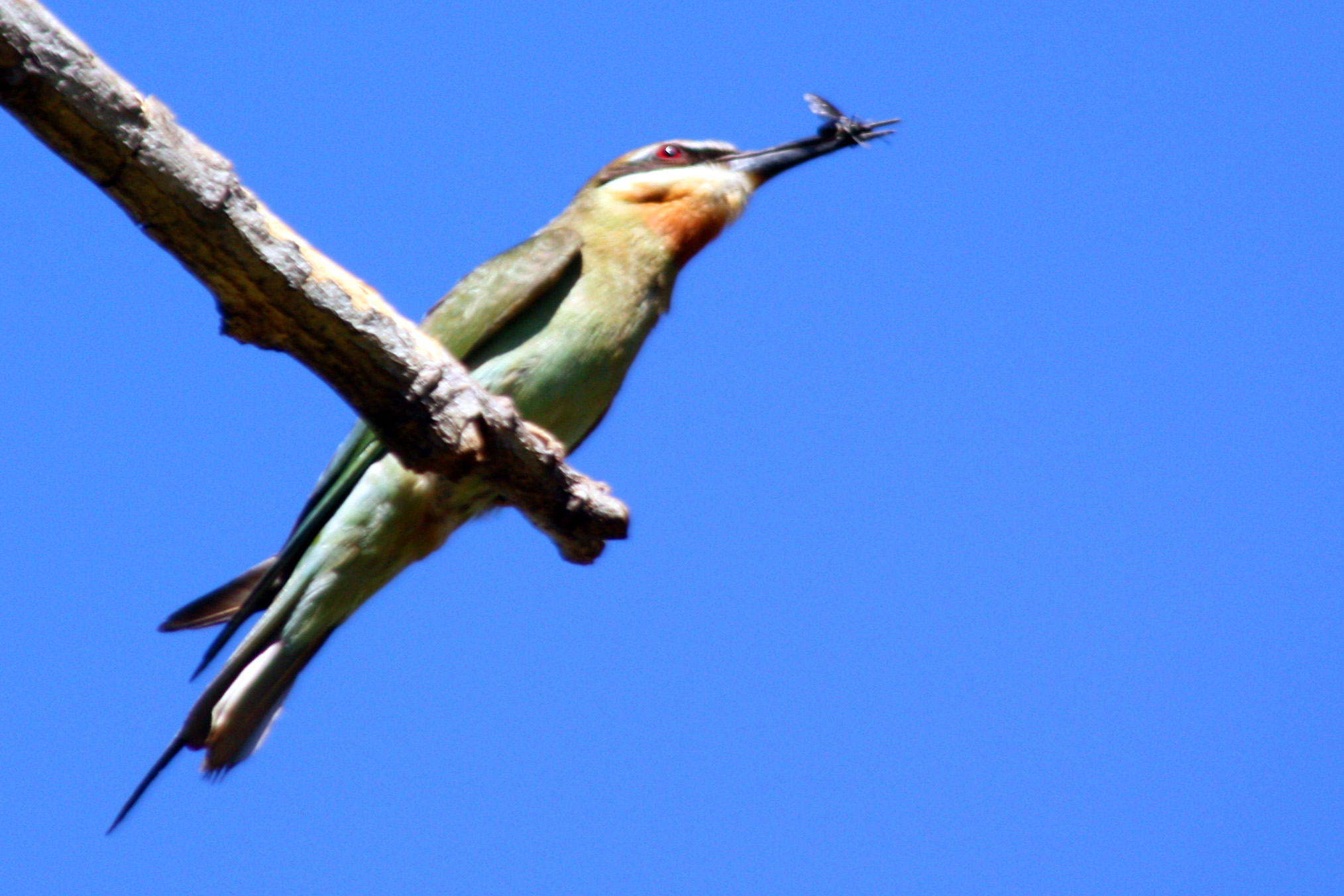
A bee caught in the Anjajavy Forest

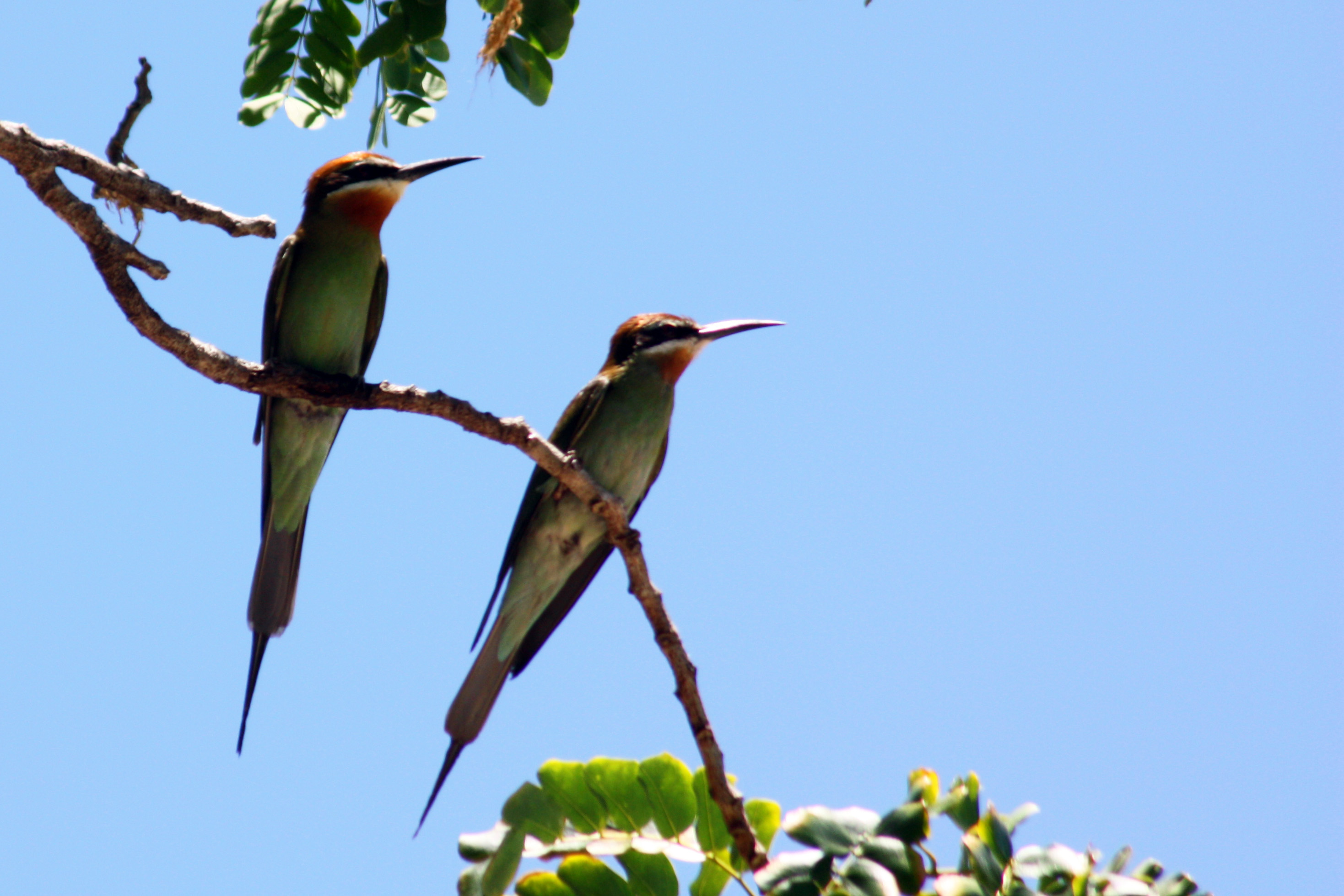
Pair in the Anjajavy Forest

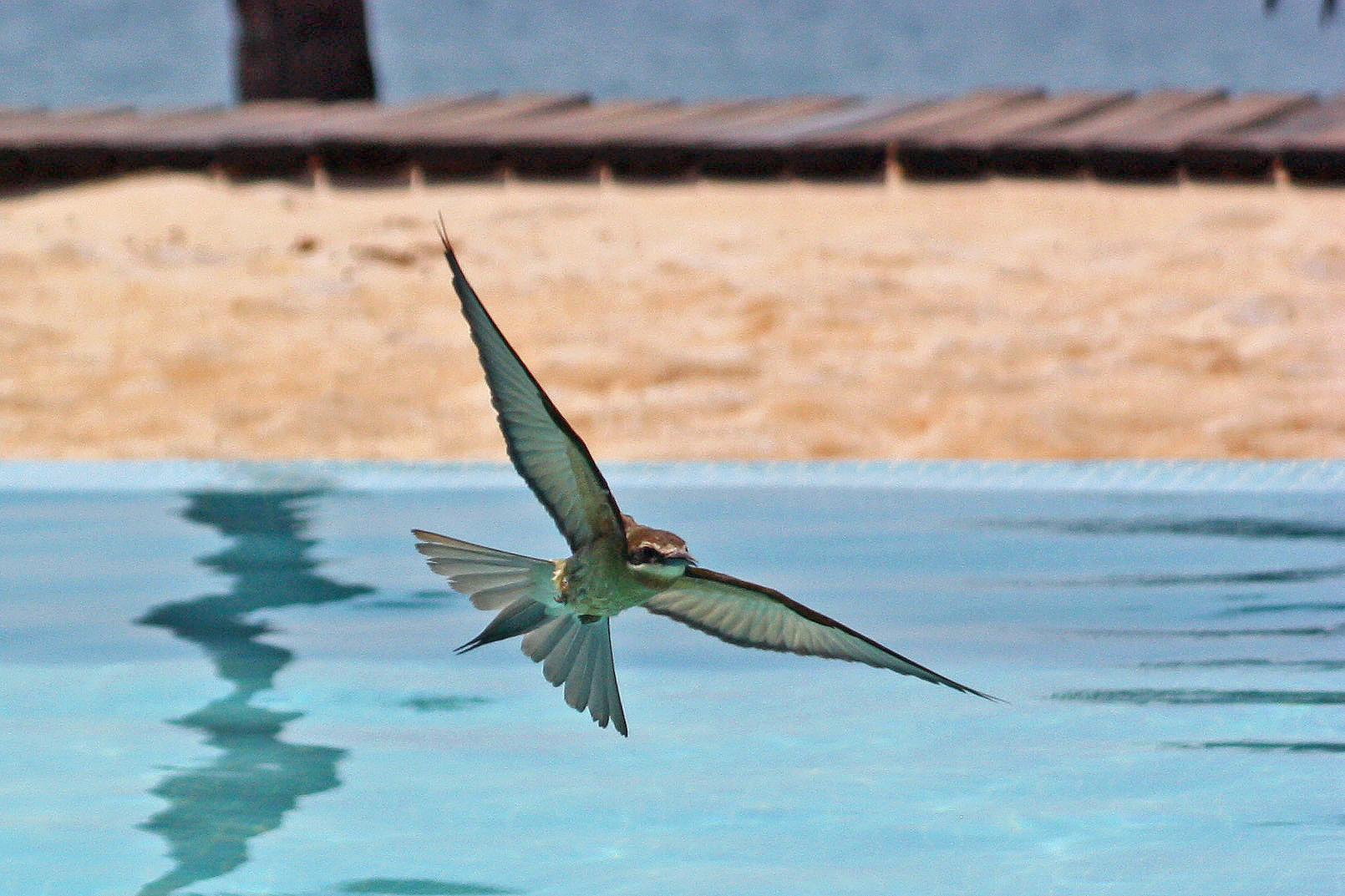
In flight over a swimming pool at Anjajavy
