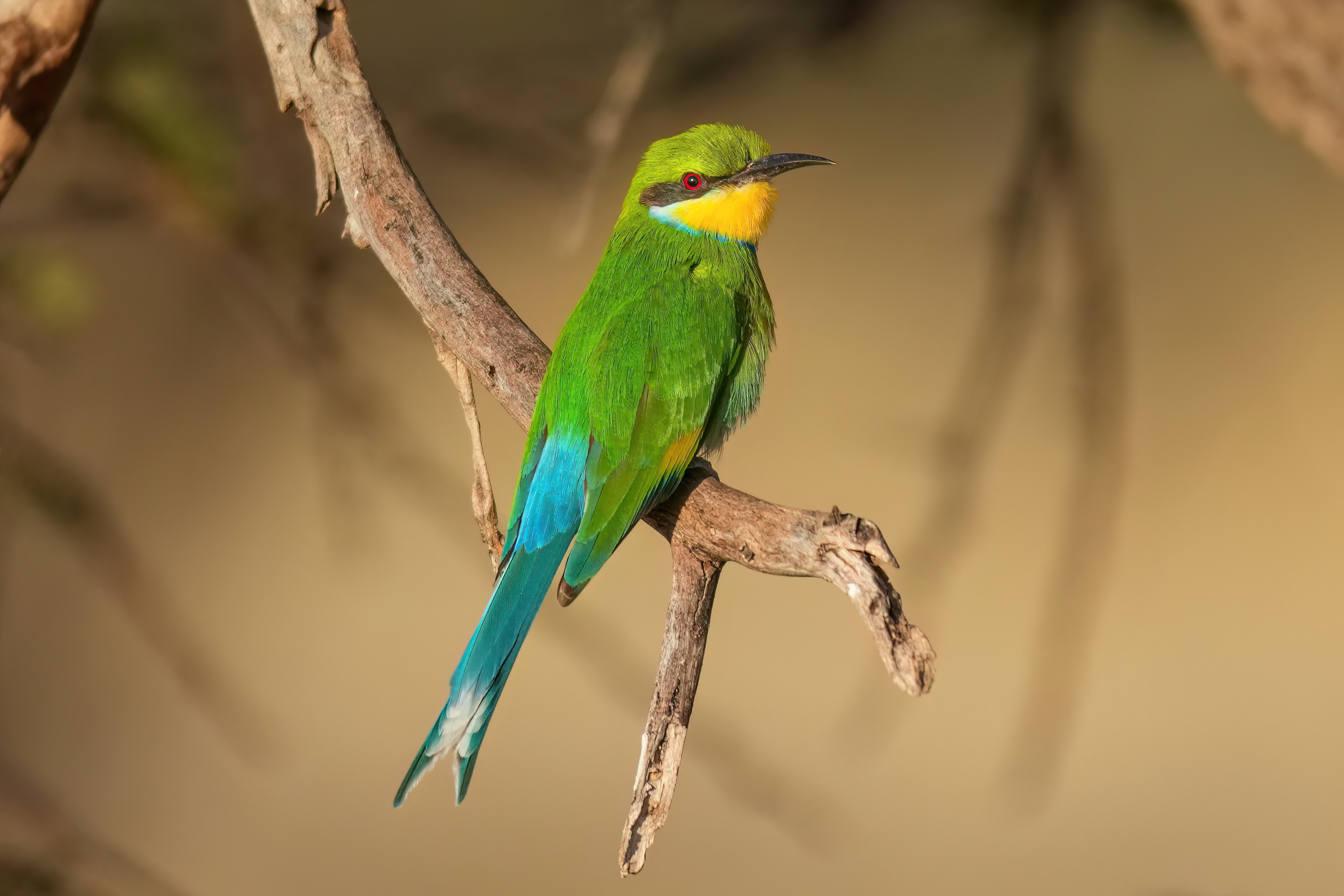
- M. hirundineus hirundineus Etosha National Park, Namibia
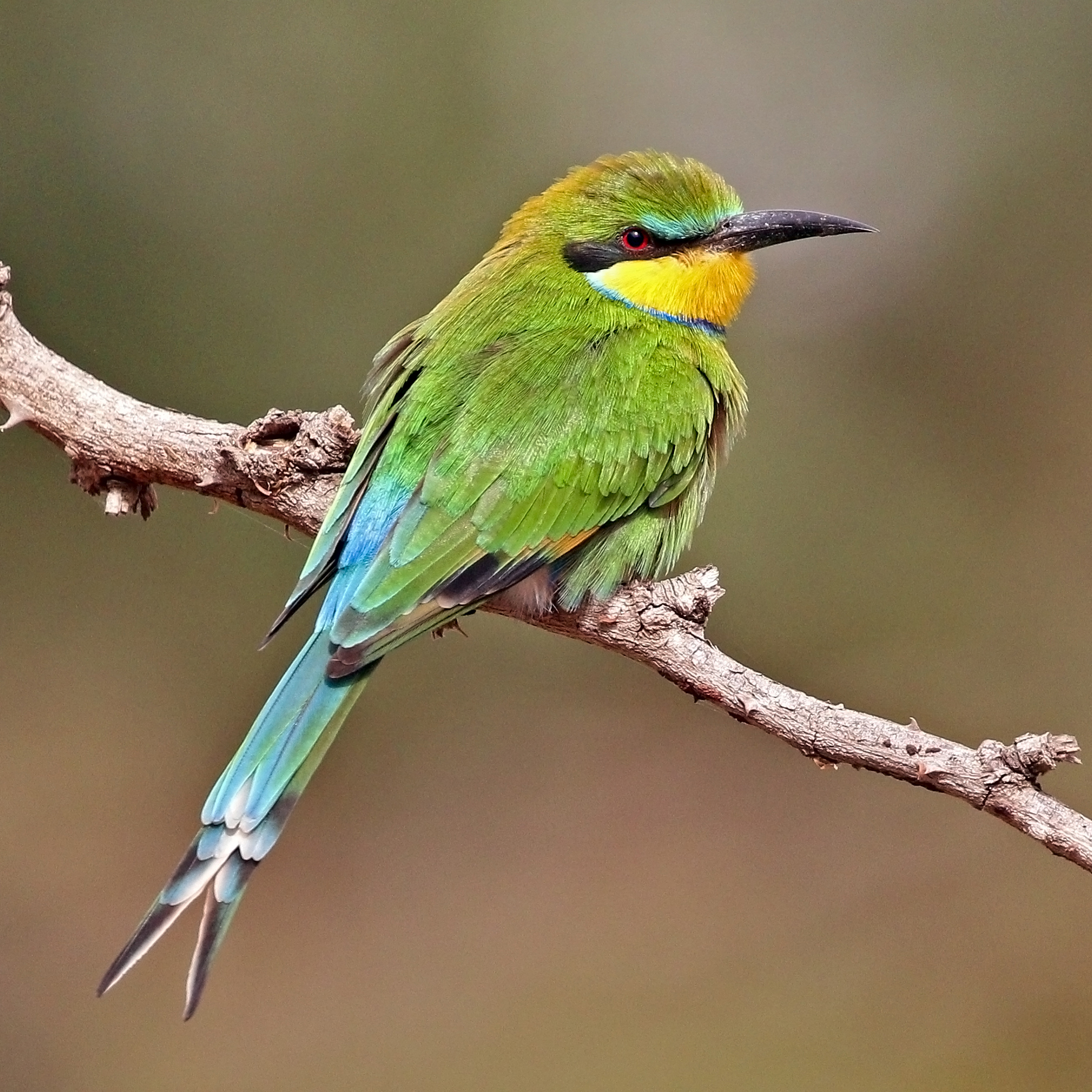
- M. hirundineus chrysolaimus Senegal

Conservation status
- Least Concern (IUCN 3.1)

Scientific classification
- Kingdom: Animalia
- Phylum: Chordata
- Class: Aves
- Order: Coraciiformes
- Family: Meropidae
- Genus: Merops
- Species: M. hirundineus

Binomial name
- Merops hirundineus Lichtenstein, AAH, 1793

Synonyms
- Dicrocercus hirundineus

= Swallow-tailed bee-eater =

Species of bird

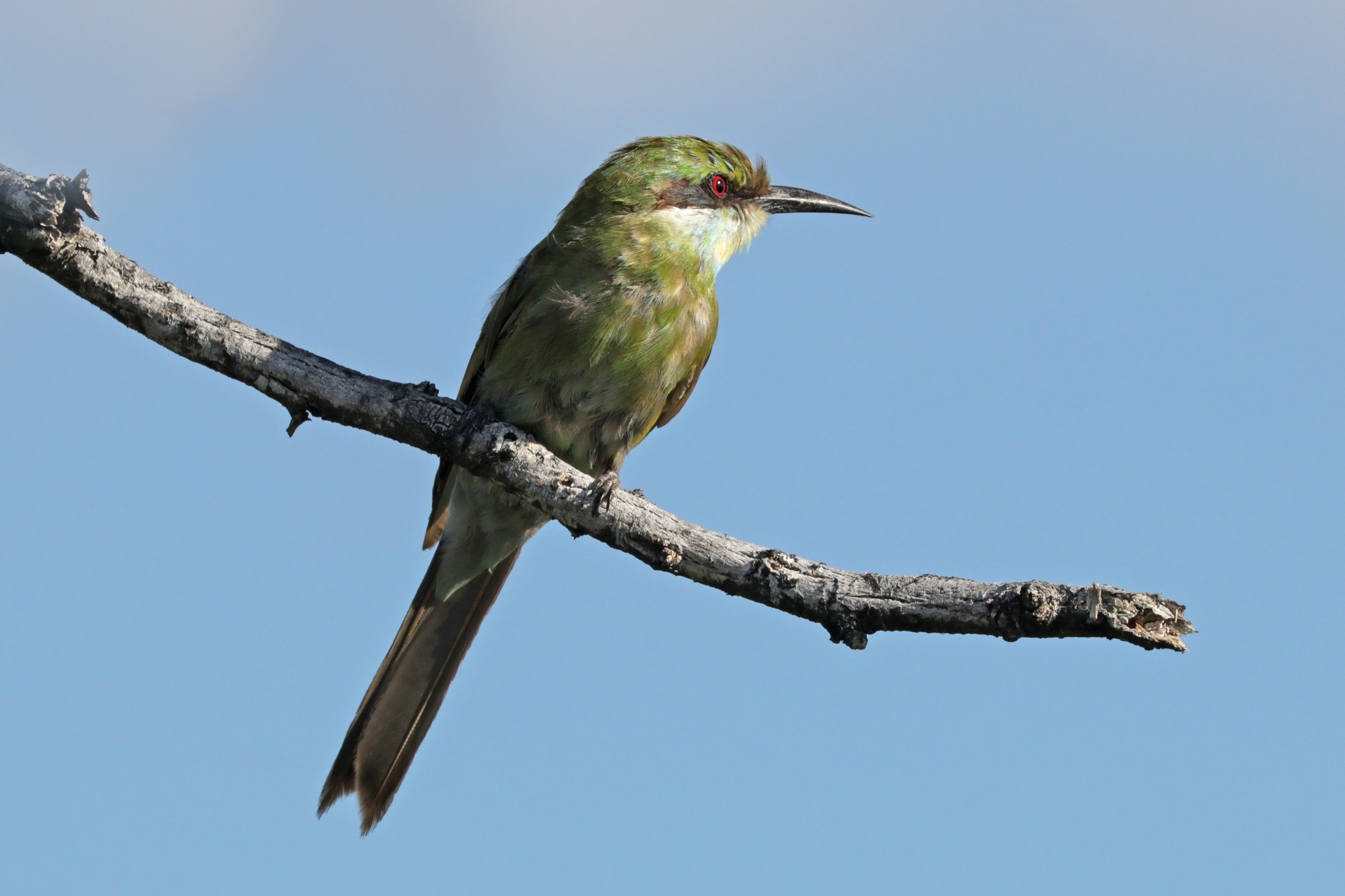
Juvenile M. h. hirundineus, Namibia

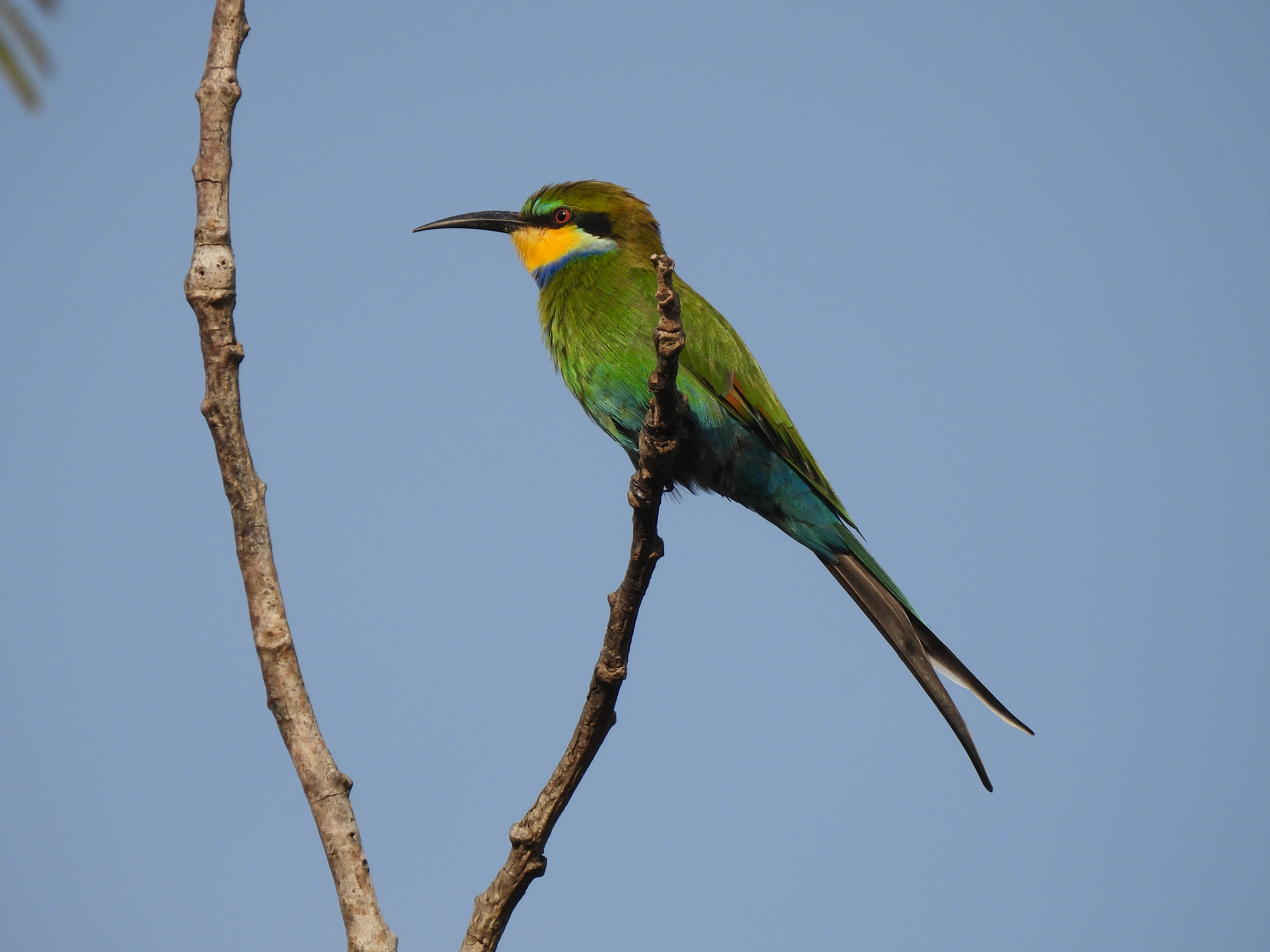
M. hirundineus chrysolaimus in The Gambia

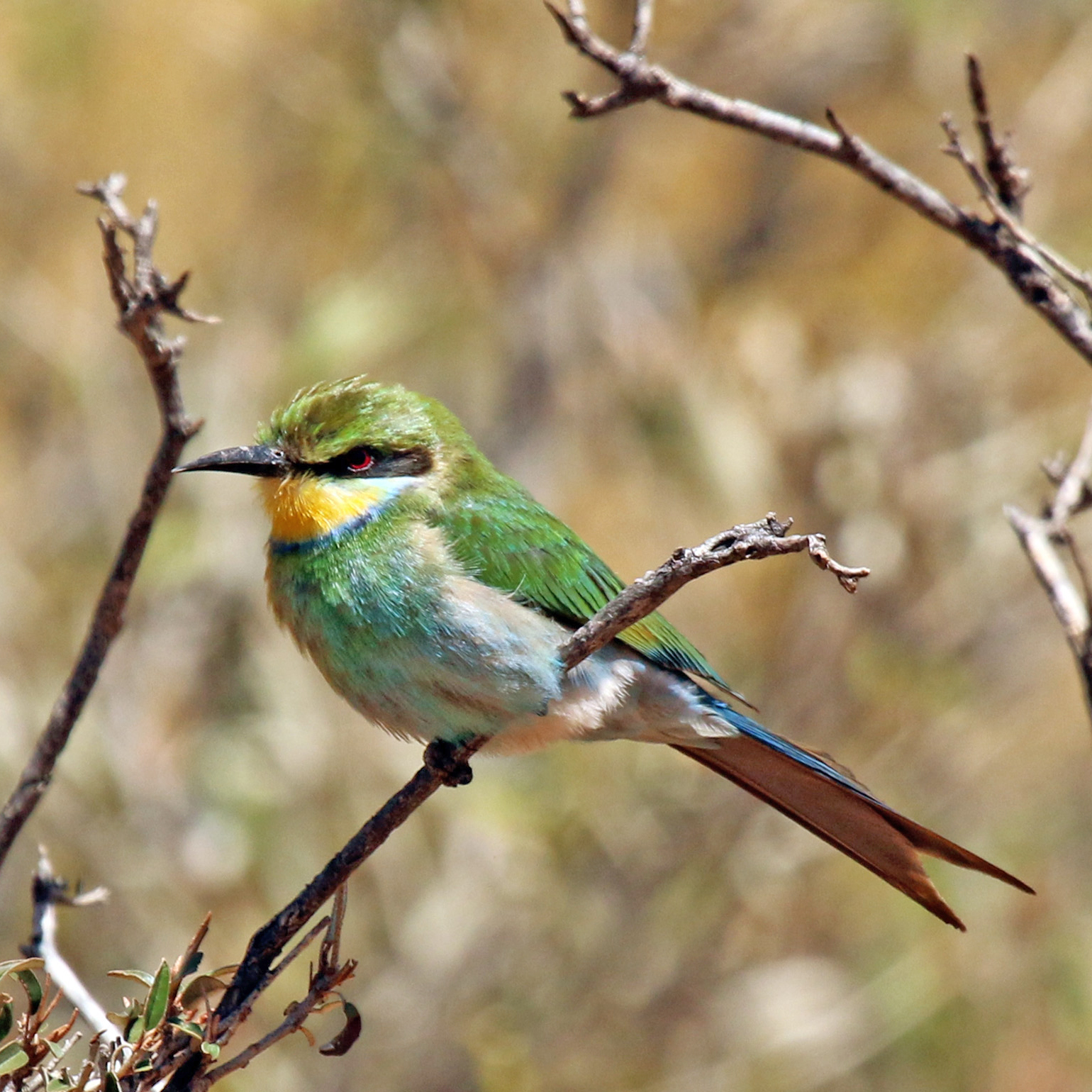
Swallow-tailed Bee-eater (Merops hirundineus hirundineus) in Tswalu Kalahari Reserve, South Africa

The swallow-tailed bee-eater (Merops hirundineus) is a species of bee-eater native to sub-Saharan Africa. It feeds predominantly on insects, especially bees and their relatives, which are caught in flight from an open perch. Its vivid colors and forked tail are distinctive.

== Description ==
Like other bee-eaters, this is a richly coloured, slender bird. Its colours and readily visible forked tail make it unmistakable. It is mainly green with a yellow throat, blue gorget and black eye stripe and beak. Swallow-tailed bee-eaters can reach a length of 20–22 cm, including the long forked green or blue feathers. Sexes are alike.

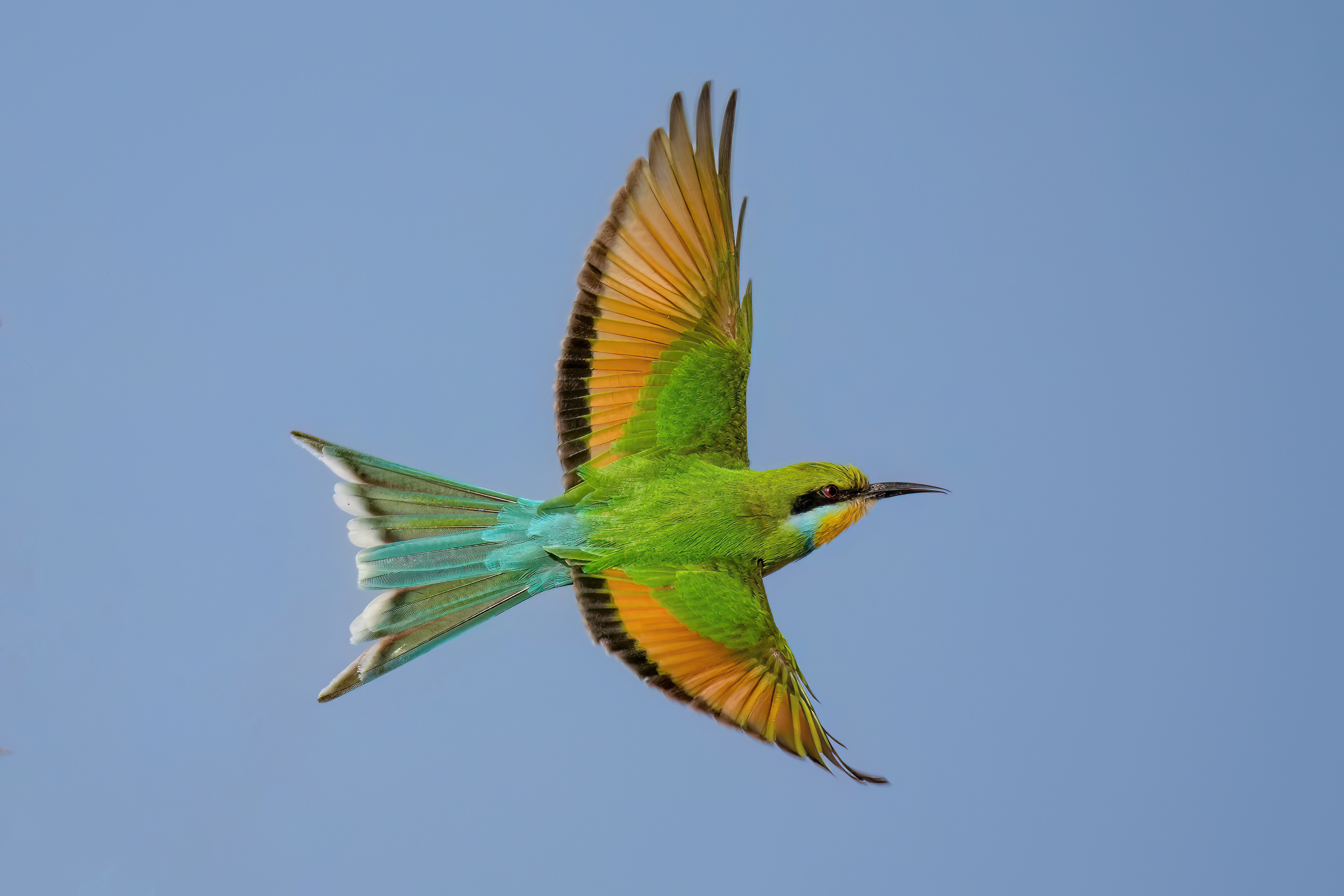
Swallow-tailed bee-eater in flight in Etosha National Park, Namibia

== Distribution and habitat ==
It breeds in savannah woodlands of sub-Saharan Africa. It is partially migratory, moving in response to rainfall patterns. This is a species which prefers somewhat more wooded country than most bee-eaters.

== Behaviour ==
This attractive bird is readily approached. Just as the name suggests, bee-eaters predominantly eat insects, especially bees, wasps and hornets, which are caught in the air by sorties from an open perch. The swallowtail has a preference for honeybees.

These bee-eaters nest as pairs or in very small colonies in sandy banks, or similar flat ground. They make a relatively long tunnel in which the 2 to 4 spherical, white eggs are laid. They also feed and roost communally.
