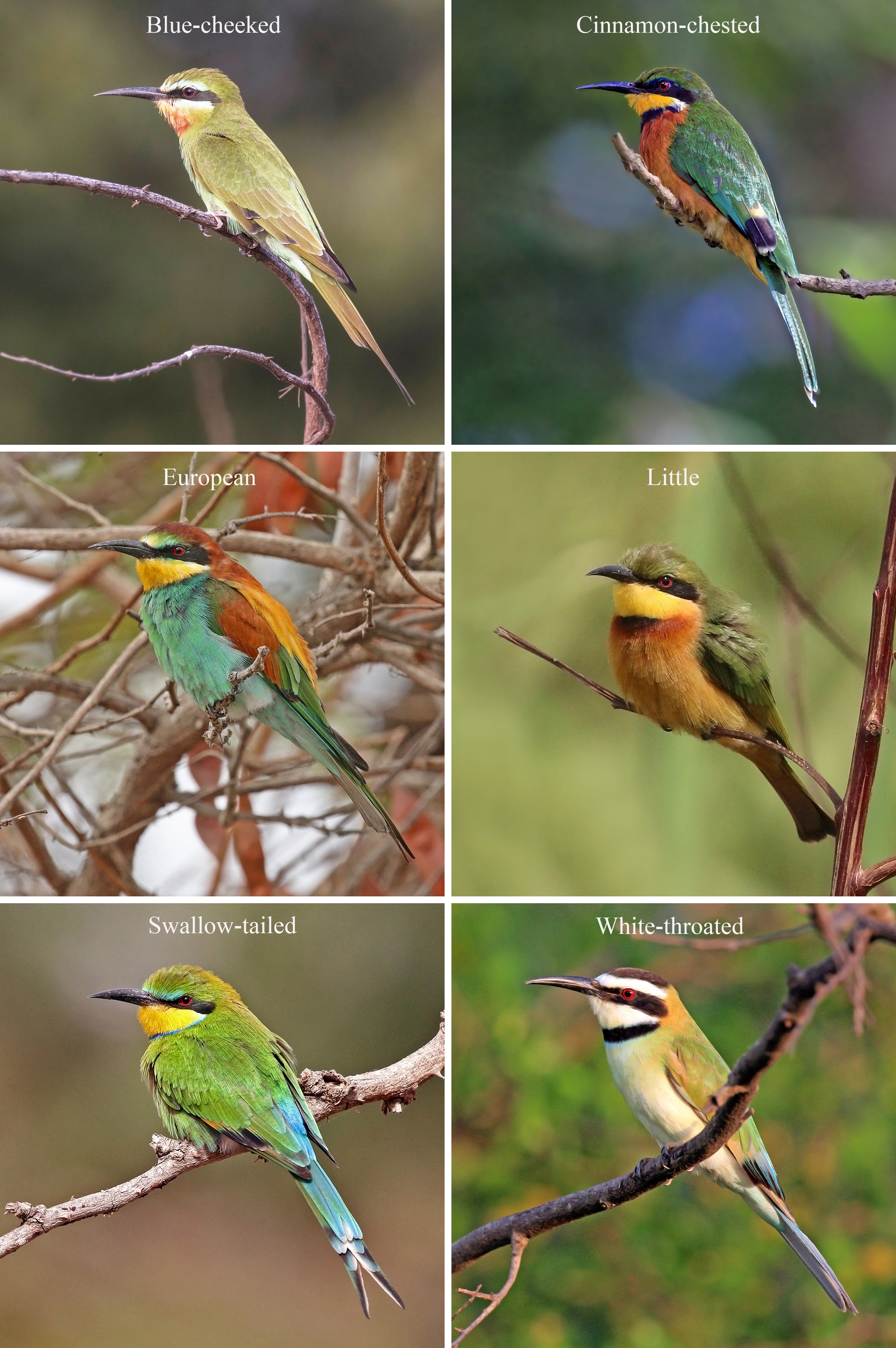
- Six common African Merops bee-eaters

Scientific classification
- Kingdom: Animalia
- Phylum: Chordata
- Class: Aves
- Order: Coraciiformes
- Family: Meropidae
- Genus: Merops; Linnaeus, 1758

Type species
- Merops apiaster Linnaeus, 1758

Species
- see text

= Merops (bird) =

Genus of birds

Merops is a large genus of bee-eaters, a group of birds in the family Meropidae, native to Africa, Asia, Australia and Europe. The members of this family are characterised by richly coloured plumage, slender bodies and usually elongated central tail feathers. They predominantly eat insects, especially bees, wasps and hornets, which are caught in the air.

== Taxonomy ==
All bee-eaters are in the genus Merops and subfamily Meropinae except for three Asiatic bearded bee-eaters in the subfamily Nyctyornithinae (in genera Nyctyornis and Meropogon). The genus Merops was introduced by the Swedish naturalist Carl Linnaeus in 1758 in the tenth edition of his Systema Naturae. The type species is the European bee-eater. The genus name is Ancient Greek for "bee-eater".

== Taxonomy and systematics ==
Twenty-eight species are recognized:

- - - - - - - Merops boehmi
            - - - - Merops muelleri
                  - Merops m. mentalis
                - - Merops gularis
                  - M. g. australis
              - - - Merops oreobates
                  - Merops hirundineus
                - - - Merops pusillus
                    - M. p. meridionalis
                  - Merops variegatus
          - - - - - - - Merops ornatus
                      - Merops apiaster
                    - - - Merops persicus
                        - Merops superciliosus
                      - Merops philippinus
                  - - - Merops viridis
                      - Merops leschenaulti
                    - Merops orientalis
                - Merops nubicus
              - Merops malimbicus
            - Merops albicollis
        - Merops breweri
      - - Merops bulocki
        - Merops bullockoides
    - Meropogon
  - Nyctyornis

Bayesian consensus phylogeny based on nuclear and mitochondrial sequences of Meropidae (missing only Nyctyornis athertoni and M. revoilii)

Image	Common name	Scientific name	Distribution
	Black-headed bee-eater	Merops breweri	Angola, Central African Republic, Republic of the Congo, Democratic Republic of the Congo, Ivory Coast, Gabon, Ghana, Nigeria, and South Sudan.
	Blue-headed bee-eater	Merops muelleri	Cameroon, Central African Republic, Republic of the Congo, Democratic Republic of the Congo, Gabon, Equatorial Guinea, and Kenya
	Blue-moustached bee-eater	Merops mentalis	Cameroon, Ivory Coast, Equatorial Guinea, Ghana, Guinea, Liberia, Nigeria, and Sierra Leone.
	Black bee-eater	Merops gularis	African tropical rainforest
	Swallow-tailed bee-eater	Merops hirundineus	sub-Saharan Africa
	Little bee-eater	Merops pusillus	Sub-Saharan Africa
	Blue-breasted bee-eater	Merops variegatus	Angola, Zambia, Tanzania, Uganda, the Democratic Republic of the Congo, Nigeria and Cameroon
	Ethiopian bee-eater	Merops lafresnayii	Eritrea; Ethiopia; South Sudan; Sudan
	Cinnamon-chested bee-eater	Merops oreobates	Albertine Rift montane forests and East African montane forests
	Red-throated bee-eater	Merops bulocki	Sudan (region)
	White-fronted bee-eater	Merops bullockoides	sub-equatorial Africa.
	Somali bee-eater	Merops revoilii	Ethiopia, through Somalia to northern and eastern Kenya
	White-throated bee-eater	Merops albicollis	southern Senegal to Uganda.
	Böhm's bee-eater	Merops boehmi	Democratic Republic of the Congo, Malawi, Mozambique, Tanzania, and Zambia.
	African green bee-eater	Merops viridissimus	sub-Saharan Africa from Senegal and the Gambia to Ethiopia; the Nile Valley
	Arabian green bee-eater	Merops cyanophrys	Arabian Peninsula and the Levant
	Asian green bee-eater	Merops orientalis	Asia from coastal southern Iran east through the Indian subcontinent to Vietnam
	Blue-cheeked bee-eater	Merops persicus	Northern Africa, and the Middle East from eastern Turkey to Kazakhstan and India
	Olive bee-eater	Merops superciliosus	Angola; Botswana; Burundi; Comoros; Democratic Republic of the Congo; Djibouti; Eritrea; Ethiopia; Kenya; Madagascar; Malawi; Mayotte; Mozambique; Namibia; Rwanda; Somalia; South Sudan; Sudan; Tanzania; Uganda; Zambia; Zimbabwe
	Blue-tailed bee-eater	Merops philippinus	southeastern Asia.
	Rainbow bee-eater	Merops ornatus	Australia, New Guinea, and some of the southern islands of Indonesia.
	Blue-throated bee-eater	Merops viridis	south-east Asia
	Rufous-crowned bee-eater	Merops americanus	the Philippines
	Chestnut-headed bee-eater	Merops leschenaulti	India east to Southeast Asia.
	European bee-eater	Merops apiaster	southern Europe and in parts of north Africa and western Asia.
	Rosy bee-eater	Merops malimbicus	Angola, Benin, Burkina Faso, Republic of the Congo, Democratic Republic of the Congo, Ivory Coast, Equatorial Guinea, Gabon, Ghana, Nigeria, and Togo.
	Northern carmine bee-eater	Merops nubicus	Benin, Burkina Faso, Cameroon, the Central African Republic, Chad, the Democratic Republic of the Congo, Côte d'Ivoire, Eritrea, Ethiopia, Gambia, Ghana, Guinea, Guinea-Bissau, Kenya, Liberia, Mali, Mauritania, Niger, Nigeria, Senegal, Sierra Leone, Somalia, Sudan, Tanzania, Togo and Uganda.
	Southern carmine bee-eater	Merops nubicoides	KwaZulu-Natal and Namibia to Gabon, the eastern DRCongo and Kenya.

=== Former species ===
Formerly, some authorities also considered the following species (or subspecies) as species within the genus Merops:

- Magpie-lark (as Merops picatus)
