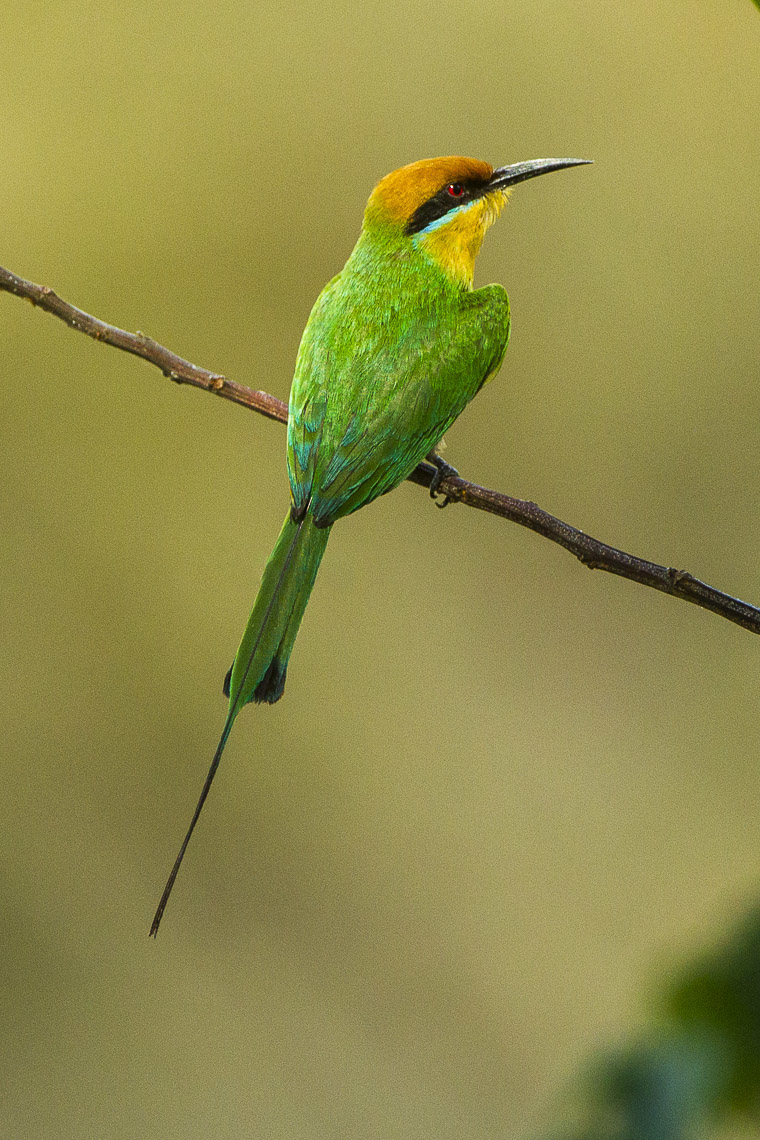

Conservation status
- Least Concern (IUCN 3.1)

Scientific classification
- Kingdom: Animalia
- Phylum: Chordata
- Class: Aves
- Order: Coraciiformes
- Family: Meropidae
- Genus: Merops
- Species: M. boehmi

Binomial name
- Merops boehmi Reichenow, 1882

Synonyms
- Aerops boehmi

= Böhm's bee-eater =

Species of bird

Böhm's bee-eater (Merops boehmi) is a species of bird in the family Meropidae. It is found in Democratic Republic of the Congo, Malawi, Mozambique, Tanzania, and Zambia.

The name of this bird commemorates the German zoologist Richard Böhm.
