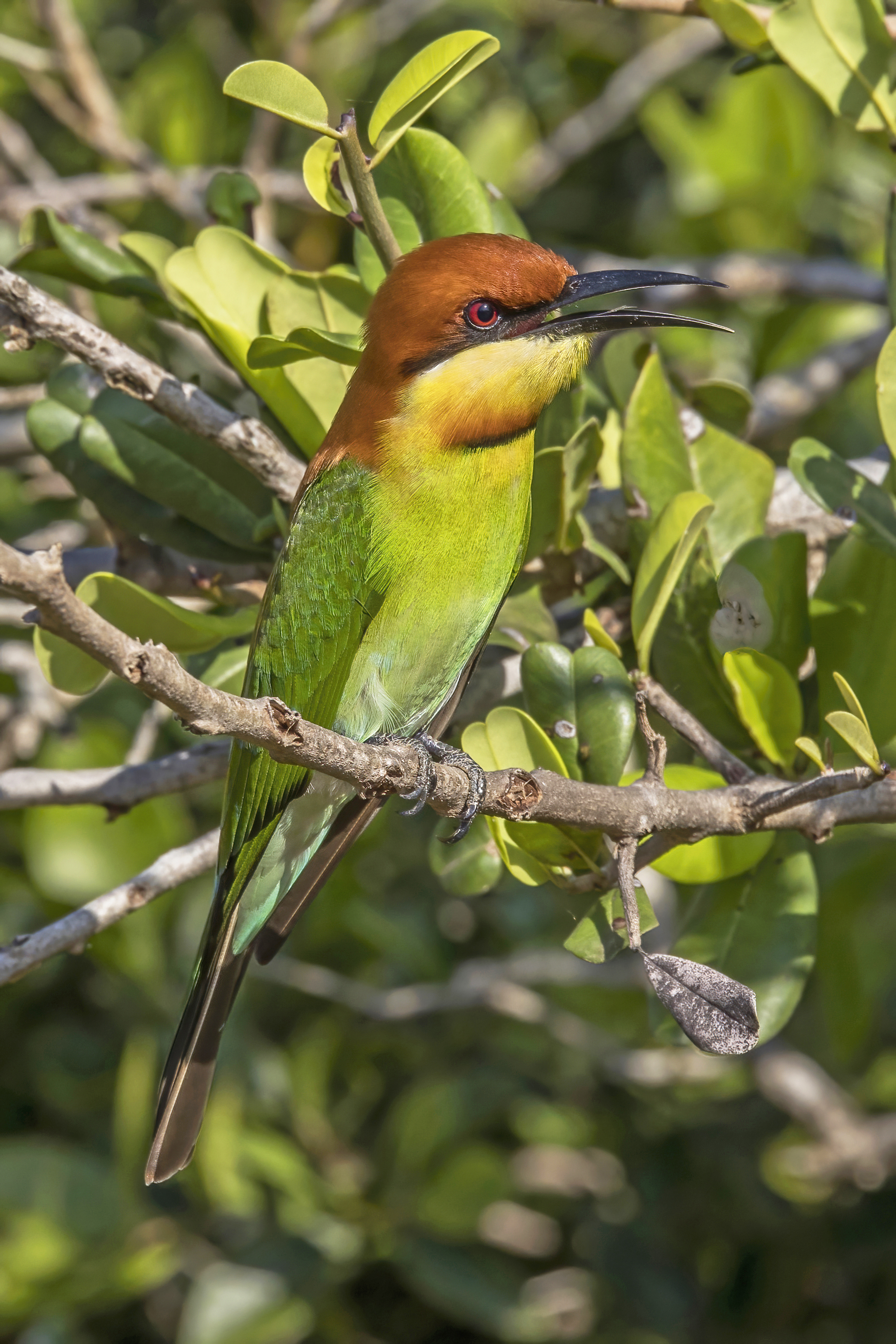
- Yala National Park, Sri Lanka
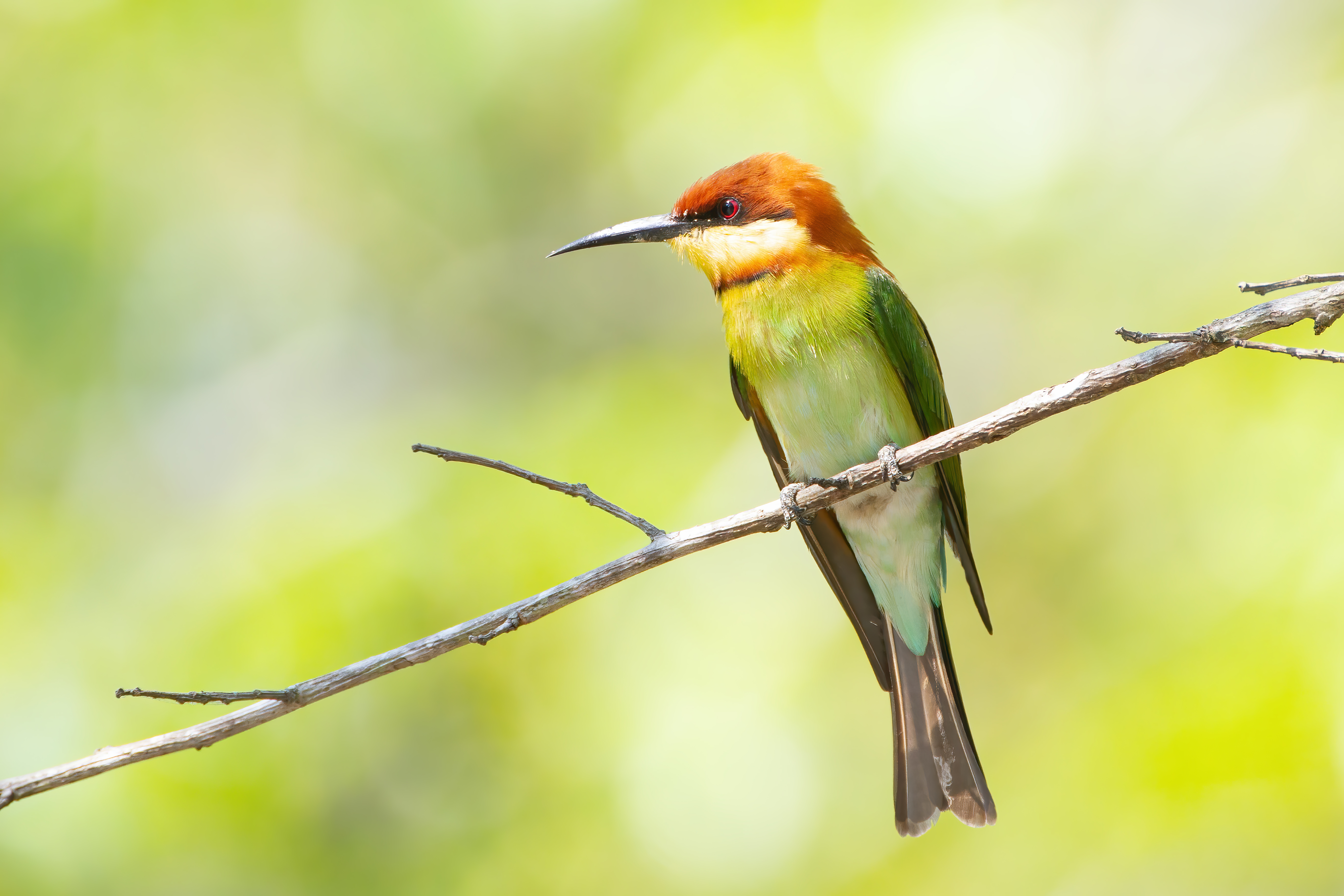
- In Kaeng Krachan, Thailand

Conservation status
- Least Concern (IUCN 3.1)

Scientific classification
- Kingdom: Animalia
- Phylum: Chordata
- Class: Aves
- Order: Coraciiformes
- Family: Meropidae
- Genus: Merops
- Species: M. leschenaulti

Binomial name
- Merops leschenaulti Vieillot, 1817

= Chestnut-headed bee-eater =

Species of bird

The chestnut-headed bee-eater (Merops leschenaulti), or bay-headed bee-eater, is a bird in the bee-eater family Meropidae. It breeds on the Indian subcontinent and adjoining regions, ranging from India, Bangladesh and Sri Lanka across Southeast Asia to Indonesia.

This species, like other bee-eaters, is a richly coloured, slender bird. It is predominantly green, with blue on the rump and lower belly. Its face and throat are yellow with a black eye stripe, and the crown and nape are rich chestnut. The thin curved bill is black. Sexes are alike, but young birds are duller. It is 18–20 cm long and lacks the two elongated central tail feathers possessed by most of its relatives.

== Taxonomy ==
The chestnut-headed bee-eater was formally described in 1817 by the French ornithologist Louis Pierre Vieillot under the current binomial name Merops leschenaulti. He specified the locality as Java. This was an error as this species does not occur there, and the locality has been designated as Sri Lanka. The specific epithet was chosen to honour the French naturalist and collector Jean-Baptiste Leschenault de La Tour who had brought Vieillot's specimen to France.

Three subspecies are recognised:

- M. l. leschenaulti Vieillot, 1817 – India and Sri Lanka to central south China, Indochina and Malay Peninsula
- M. l. quinticolor Vieillot, 1817 – far south Sumatra, Java and Bali
- M. l. andamanensis Marien, 1950 – Andaman Islands

Molecular phylogenetics places the species as a sister of Merops viridis which together are sister to M. orientalis.

== Description ==
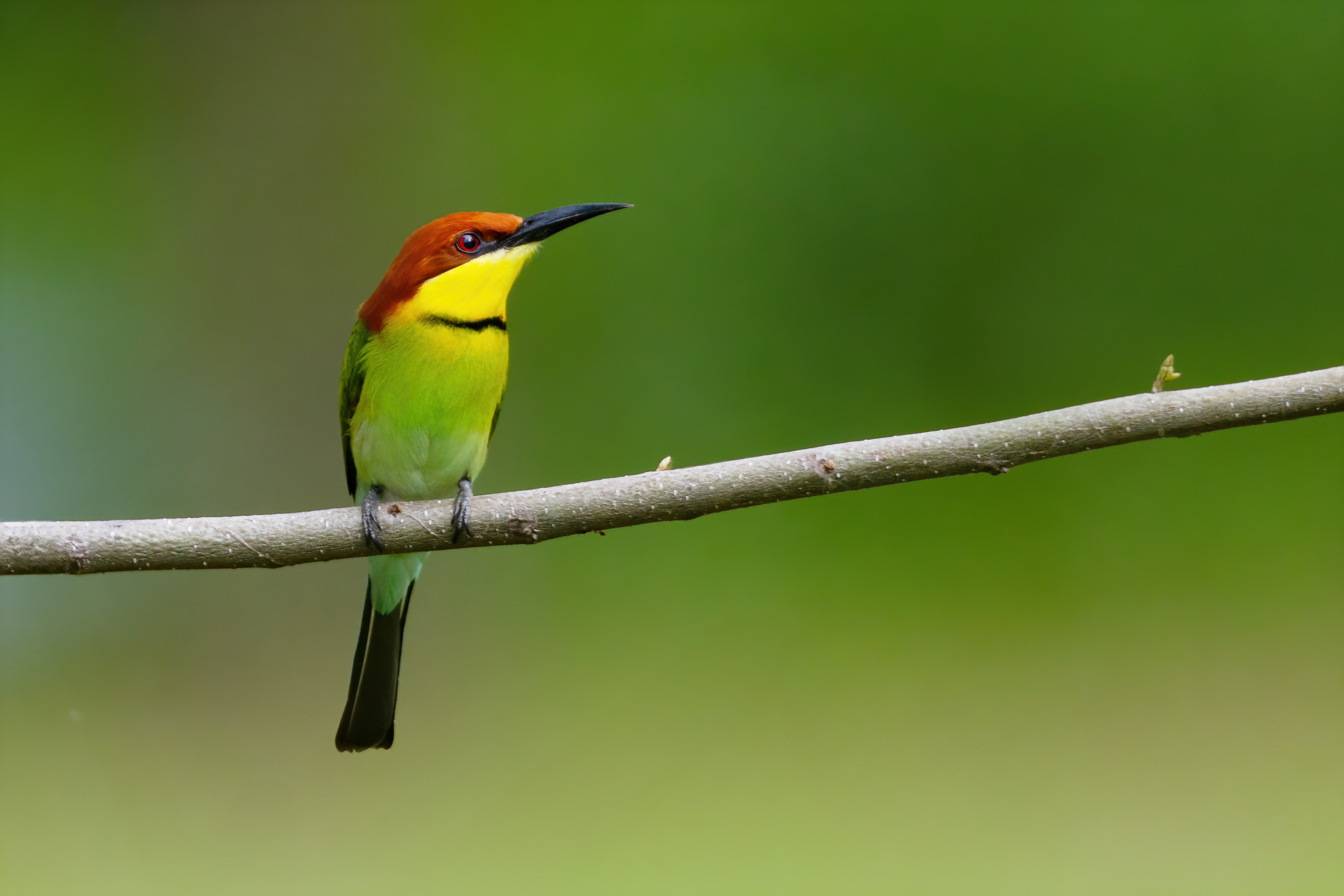
M. l. quinticolor, in West Bali National Park, Indonesia

The chestnut-headed bee-eater is 18–20 cm (7.1–7.9 in) in overall length and weighs 26–33 g (0.92–1.16 oz). The sexes are similar in appearance. The forehead, crown, nape, mantle and ear-coverts are bright chestnut. The lores are black, continued as a thin band under the eye and ear-coverts. The wing coverts, lower back and tertials are green, the latter are tipped with bluish. The rump and uppertail coverts are pale shining blue. The primaries and secondaries are green, rufous on the inner webs, and all tipped dusky. The central tail-feathers are bluish on the outer, and green on the inner webs; the others are green, margined on the inner web with brown and all tipped dusky. The sides of the face, chin and throat are yellow; below this a broad band of chestnut extending to the sides of the neck and meeting the chestnut of the upper plumage; below this again is a gorget formed by a short distinct band of black and then an ill-defined band of yellow. The remainder of lower plumage is green tipped with blue, especially on the vent and undertail coverts. The iris is red, the bill is black, the legs are dusky black and the claws dark horn-colour. The juveniles are like the adult but duller. They a green forehead, forecrown and mantle. The lower throat is yellow rather than chestnut and the gorget band is indistinct. The breast and belly are paler and more olive in colour than the adult.

The Javan sub-species, M. l. quinticolor, differs in having the space from the bill down to the black pectoral band pure yellow without any chestnut, and in having an entirely blue tail. Race andamanensis found in the Andamans is slightly larger than the mainland Indian population.

== Distribution and habitat ==
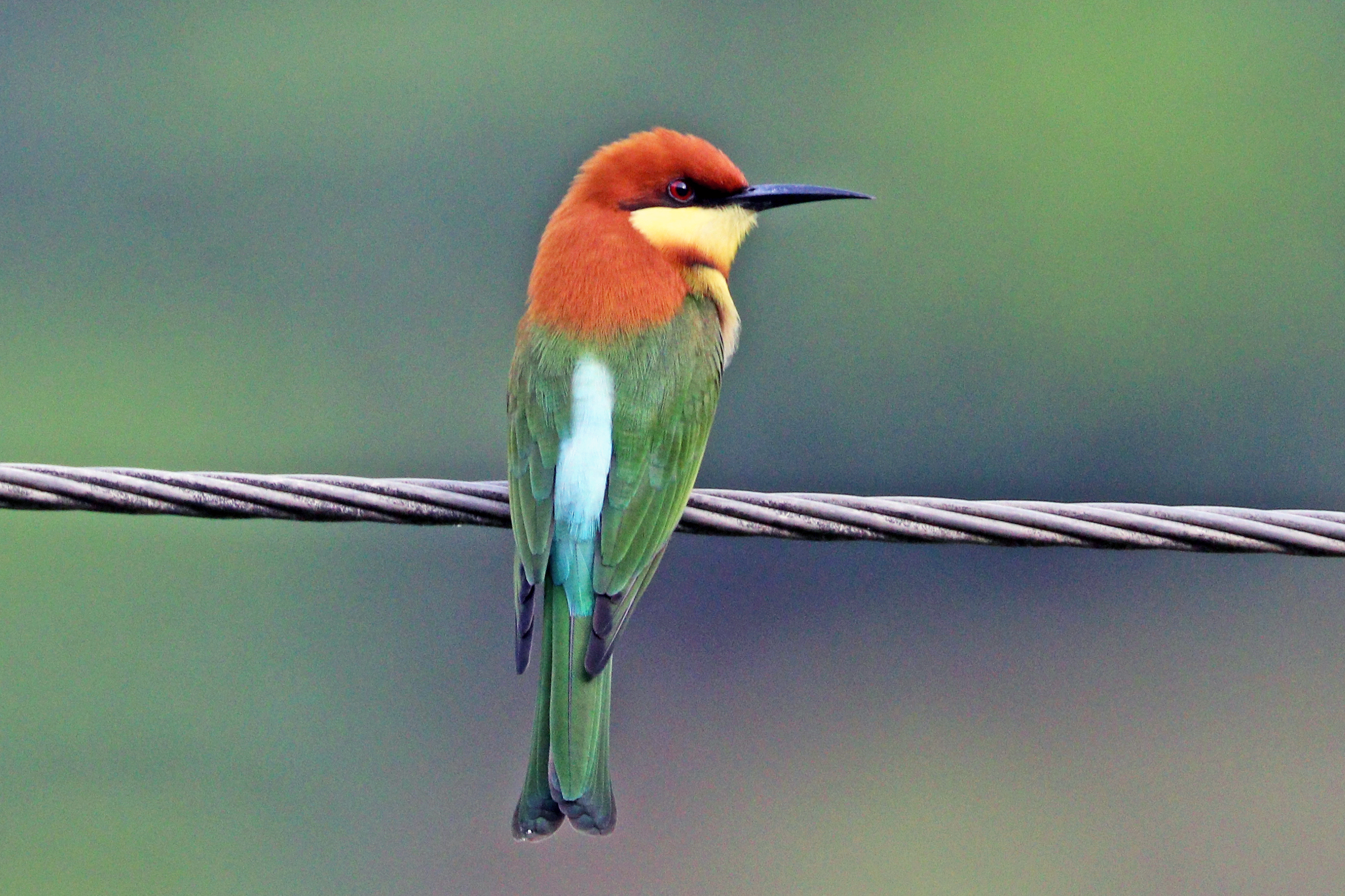
Nominate subspecies (in Kerala)

This is a bird which breeds in sub-tropical open woodland. It is most common in highland areas.

== Behaviour ==
These birds are gregarious and feed and roost communally.

=== Breeding ===
Chestnut-headed bee-eaters usually nest in small colonies in sandy banks. They make a relatively long tunnel in which the five to six spherical white eggs are laid. Both the male and the female take care of the eggs and feed the young.

=== Food and feeding ===
As the name suggests, bee-eaters predominantly eat insects, especially bees, wasps and hornets, which are caught in the air by sorties from an open perch. Instances of feeding on fish by flying over water are known.
