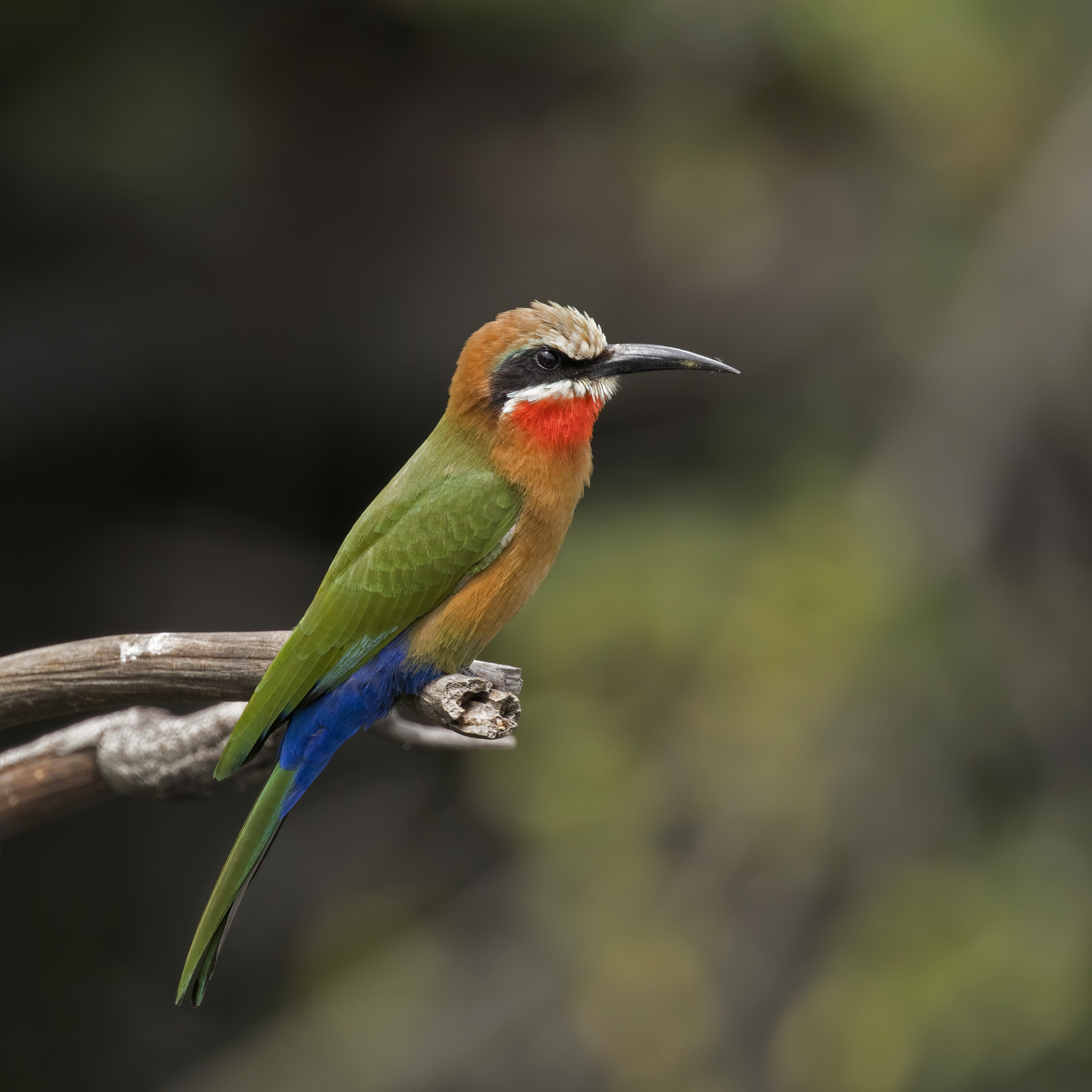
- In Namibia

Conservation status
- Least Concern (IUCN 3.1)

Scientific classification
- Kingdom: Animalia
- Phylum: Chordata
- Class: Aves
- Order: Coraciiformes
- Family: Meropidae
- Genus: Merops
- Species: M. bullockoides

Binomial name
- Merops bullockoides Smith, A, 1834

= White-fronted bee-eater =

Species of bird

The white-fronted bee-eater (Merops bullockoides) is a species of bee-eater widely distributed in sub-equatorial Africa.

The species has a distinctive white forehead, a square tail, and a bright red patch on its throat. It nests in small colonies, digging holes in cliffs or earthen banks, and can usually be seen in low trees, waiting to hunt passing insects by making quick hawking flights or gliding down before hovering briefly to catch the prey.

== Description ==
This species, like other bee-eaters, is a richly coloured, slender bird, but with a distinctive black mask, white forehead, square tail and a bright red throat. The size is 23 cm (9 in.). The upperparts are green, with cinnamon underparts. The call is a deep squeak.

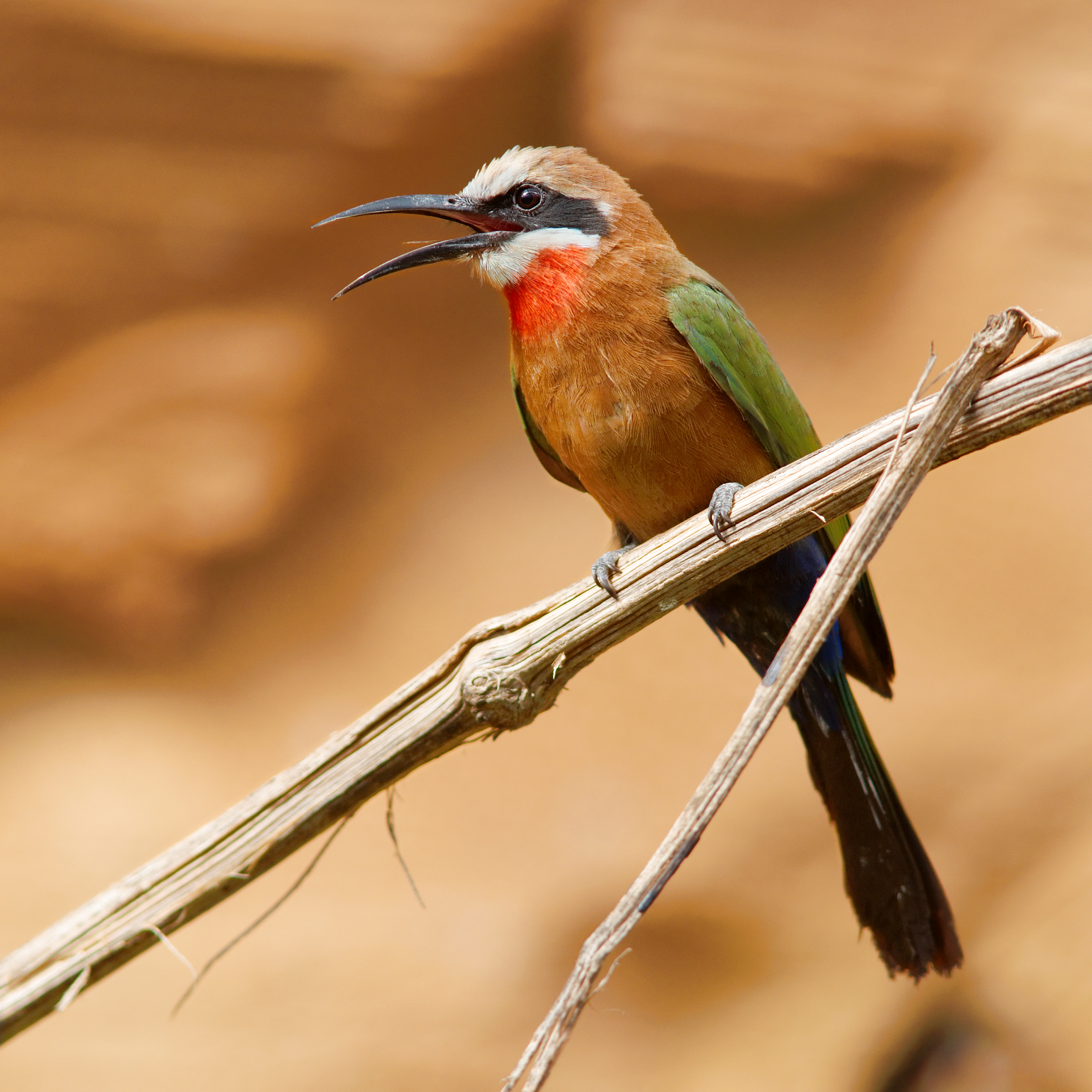
Perched on a branch

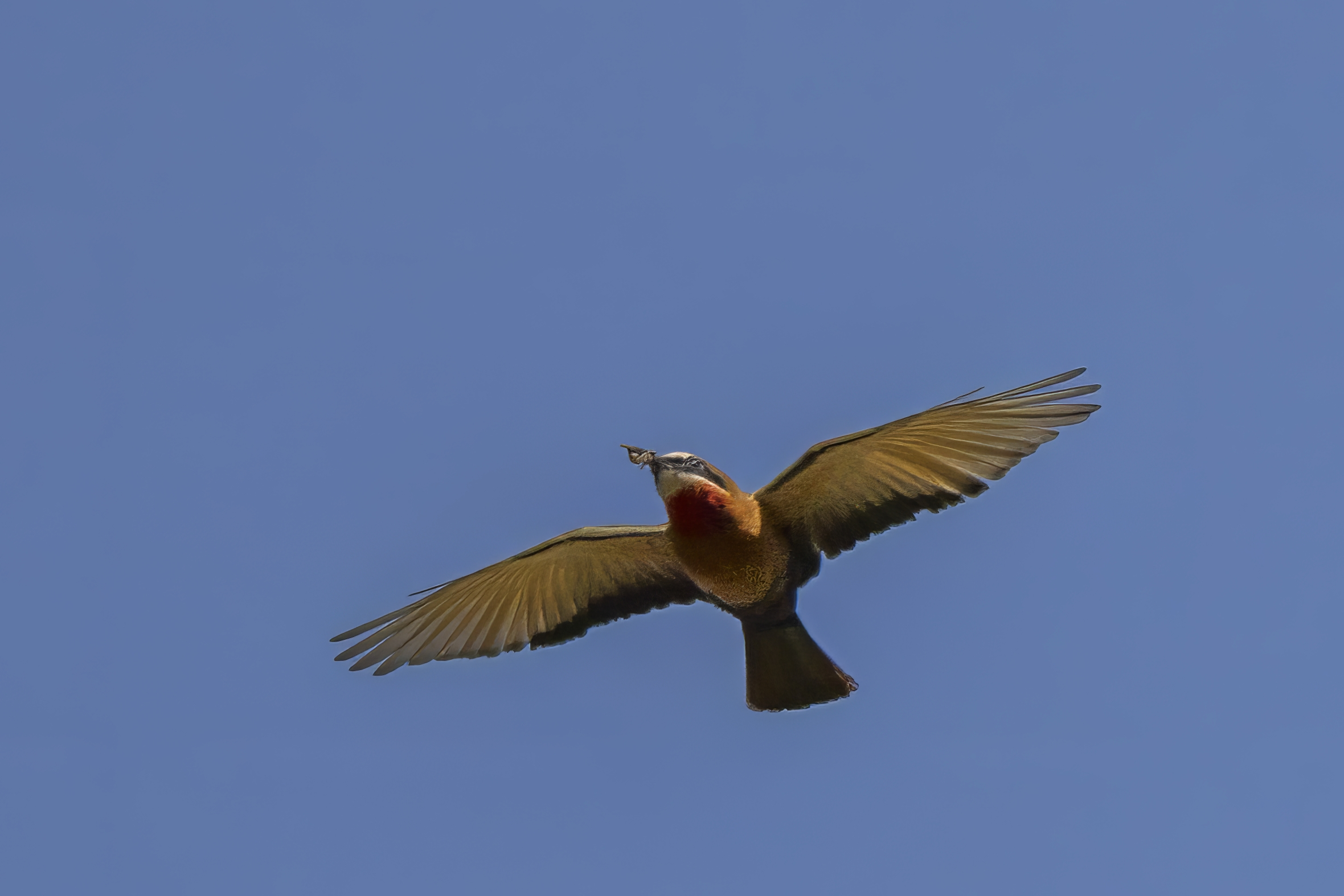
In flight

== Distribution ==
White-fronted bee-eaters are found in the vast savannah regions of sub-equatorial Africa. The habitat commonly consists of open country, often near gullies, where bees, their prey, live.

== Behaviour ==
=== Nesting and reproduction ===
White-fronted bee-eaters nest in colonies averaging 200 individuals, digging, roosting, and nesting holes in cliffs or banks of earth. A population of bee-eaters may range across many square kilometres of savannah, but will come to the same colony to roost, socialize, and to breed. White-fronted bee-eaters have one of the most complex family-based social systems found in birds.

Colonies comprise socially monogamous, extended family groups with overlapping generations, known as "clans", which exhibit cooperative breeding. Non-breeding individuals become helpers to relatives and assist to raise their brood. In white-fronted bee-eaters, this helping behavior is particularly well developed, with helpers assisting in half of all nesting attempts. These helpers may contribute to all aspects of the reproductive attempt, from digging the roosting or nesting chamber, to allofeeding the female, incubating and feeding the young; and have a large effect on increasing the number of young produced.

Only 50% of non-breeders in a colony typically become helpers, and whether or not an individual becomes a helper and to whom it provides aid is heavily dependent on the degree of kinship involved. Non-breeders are most likely to become helpers when breeding pairs are genetically close relatives. When faced with a choice of potential recipient nests, helpers preferentially help the breeding pair to whom they are most closely related, suggesting that this behaviour may serve to increase the helper's inclusive fitness.

Female white-fronted bee-eaters leaving their nesting burrows must avoid pursuit by unmated males who may force them to the ground and rape them. Furthermore, their unwelcome attentions are preferentially against females who are laying eggs and who thus might lay the eggs of their rapist rather than their mate.

=== Feeding and diet ===
Their diet is made up primarily of bees, but they also take other flying insects depending on the season and availability of prey. Two hunting methods have been observed. They either make quick hawking flights from lower branches of shrubs and trees, or glide slowly down from their perch and hover briefly to catch insects.
