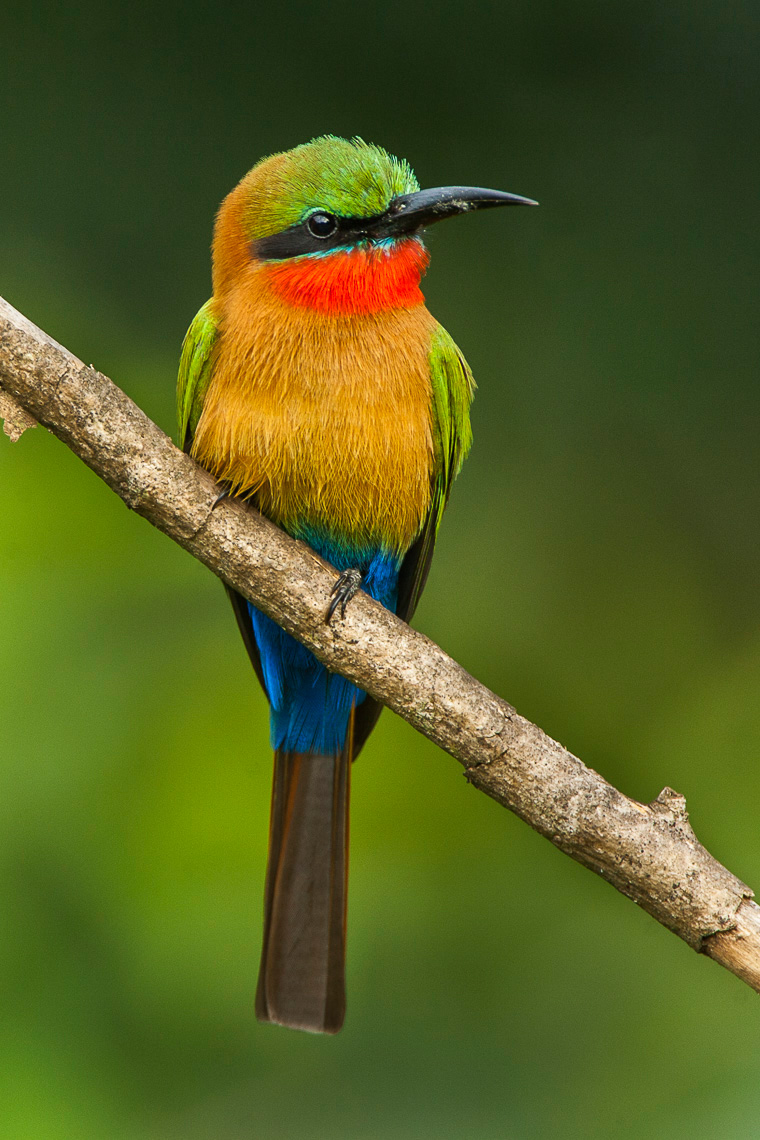

Conservation status
- Least Concern (IUCN 3.1)

Scientific classification
- Kingdom: Animalia
- Phylum: Chordata
- Class: Aves
- Order: Coraciiformes
- Family: Meropidae
- Genus: Merops
- Species: M. bulocki

Binomial name
- Merops bulocki Vieillot, 1817
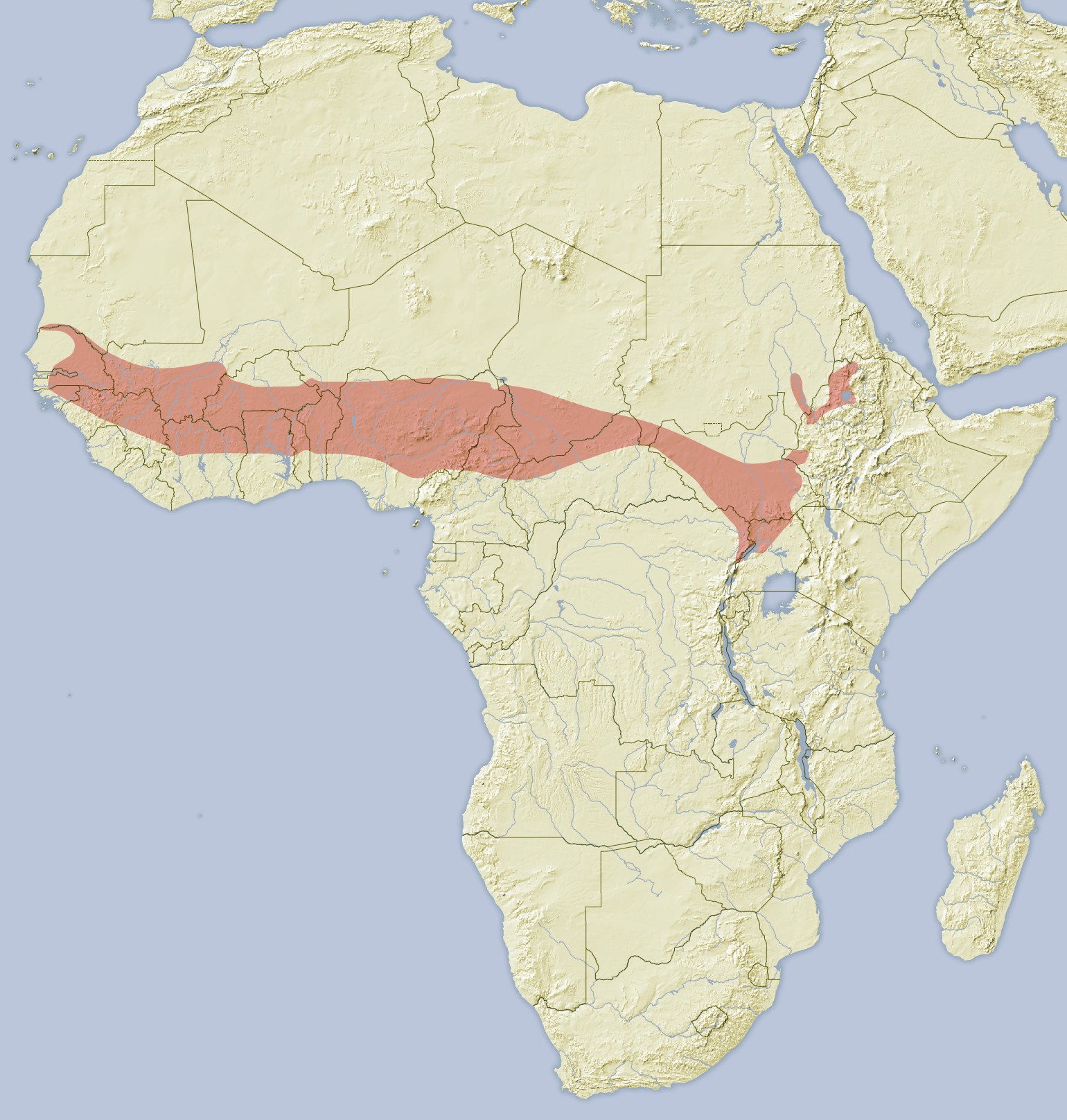

= Red-throated bee-eater =

Species of bird

The red-throated bee-eater (Merops bulocki) is a species of bird in the family Meropidae. This species is native to the Sudan (region). It has a wide range and large total population, and the International Union for Conservation of Nature has assessed its conservation status as being of "least concern".

== Description ==
The adult red-throated bee eater grows to about 20 to 22 cm (8 to 9 in) in length with a moderately long tail, but no streamers. The upper parts are green and the red chin and throat are distinctive, though about 1% of individuals have a yellow throat. The hind neck, breast and underparts are buff, and the under-tail coverts and thighs are bright blue. To the east of the Central African Republic, the birds have blue facial features while to the west these features are green.

== Distribution and habitat ==
The red-throated bee-eater has a wide distribution across tropical Africa, its range extending from Senegal and Gambia in the west to Uganda, southern Sudan, and Ethiopia in the east. Its typical habitat is savannah with scattered trees, farmland with trees, the edges of marshes, bushy pastures and gardens, but the birds are rarely to be found far from the erosion gullies, streams and small rivers, in the banks of which they nest.

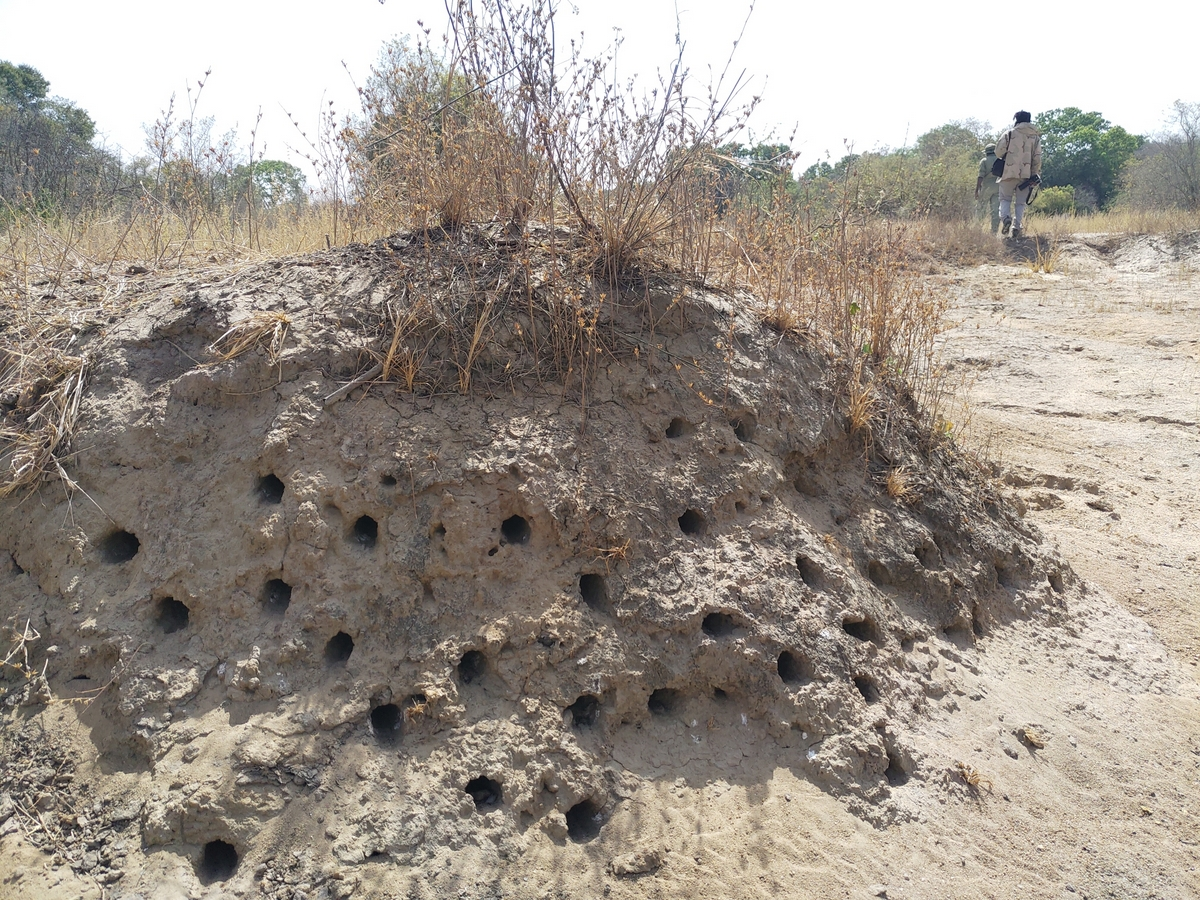
Ground nests of red-throated bee-eaters next to a stream in Yankari National Park, Bauchi, Nigeria

== Ecology ==
The red-throated bee-eater is a colonial species, nesting in groups and remaining in the nesting area all year round. The nests are tunnels, excavated before the ground dries after the rainy season, the colony having up to about fifty nests. The diet of these birds consists mostly of honey-bees and stingless bees, as well as other insects. When foraging, a pair or a few individuals move around together, and can sometimes be seen perched in a row side by side.

The species epithet is after William Bullock from whose collection the species was described.
