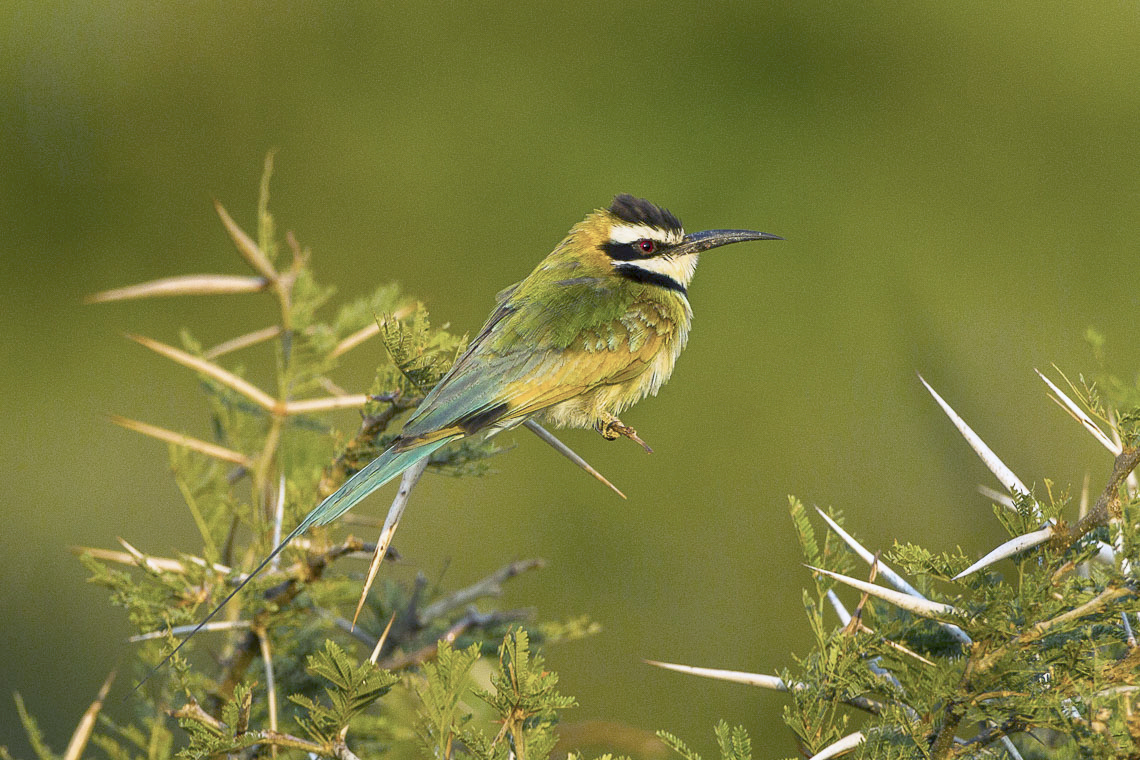

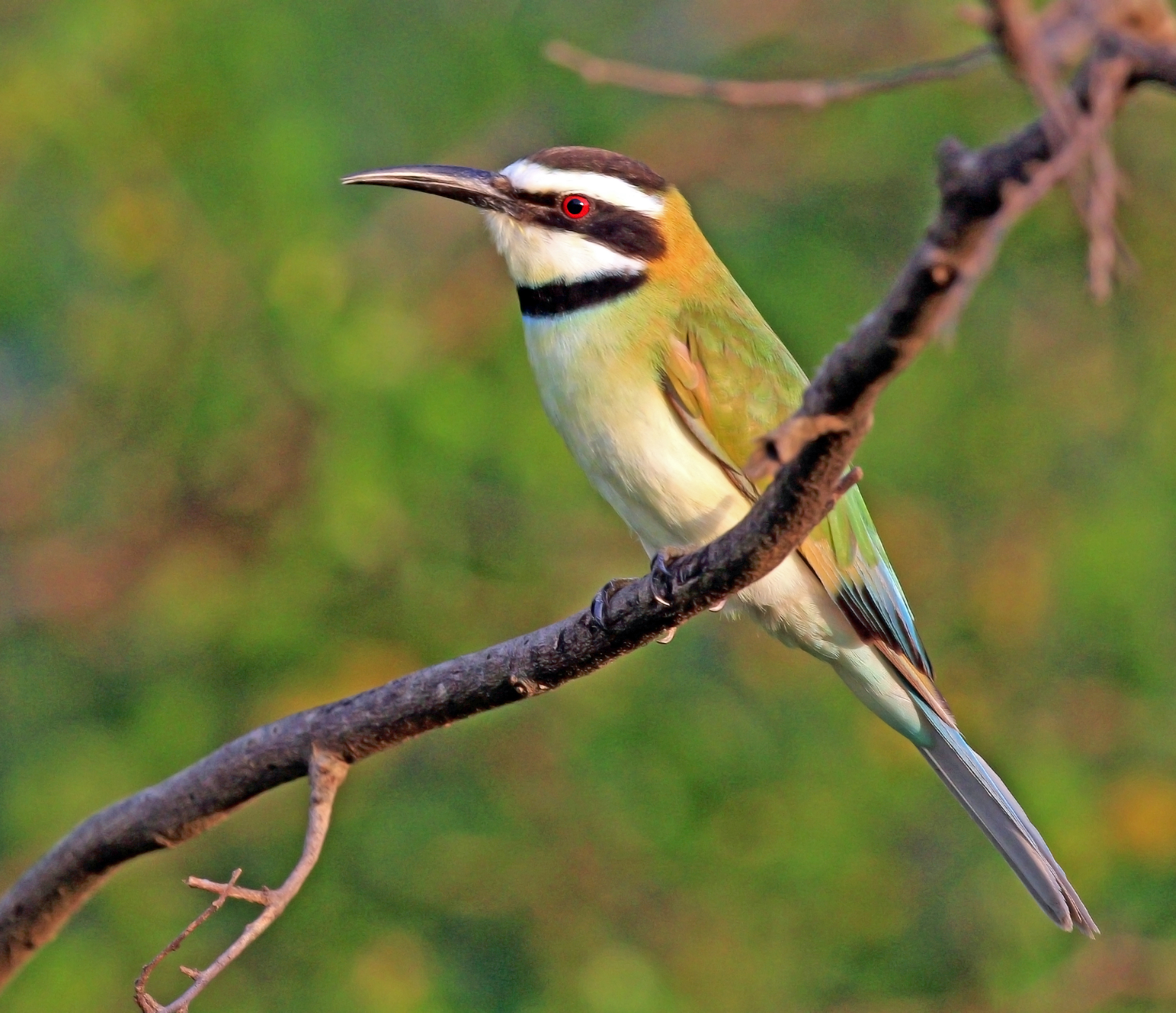
- male and female in Kenya and Uganda respectively

Conservation status
- Least Concern (IUCN 3.1)

Scientific classification
- Kingdom: Animalia
- Phylum: Chordata
- Class: Aves
- Order: Coraciiformes
- Family: Meropidae
- Genus: Merops
- Species: M. albicollis

Binomial name
- Merops albicollis Vieillot, 1817

Synonyms
- Aerops albicollis

= White-throated bee-eater =

Species of bird

The white-throated bee-eater (Merops albicollis) is a species of bee-eater that breeds in semi-desert along the southern edge of the Sahara. The white-throated bee-eater is migratory, wintering in a completely different habitat in the equatorial rain forests of Africa from southern Senegal to Uganda.

== Description ==
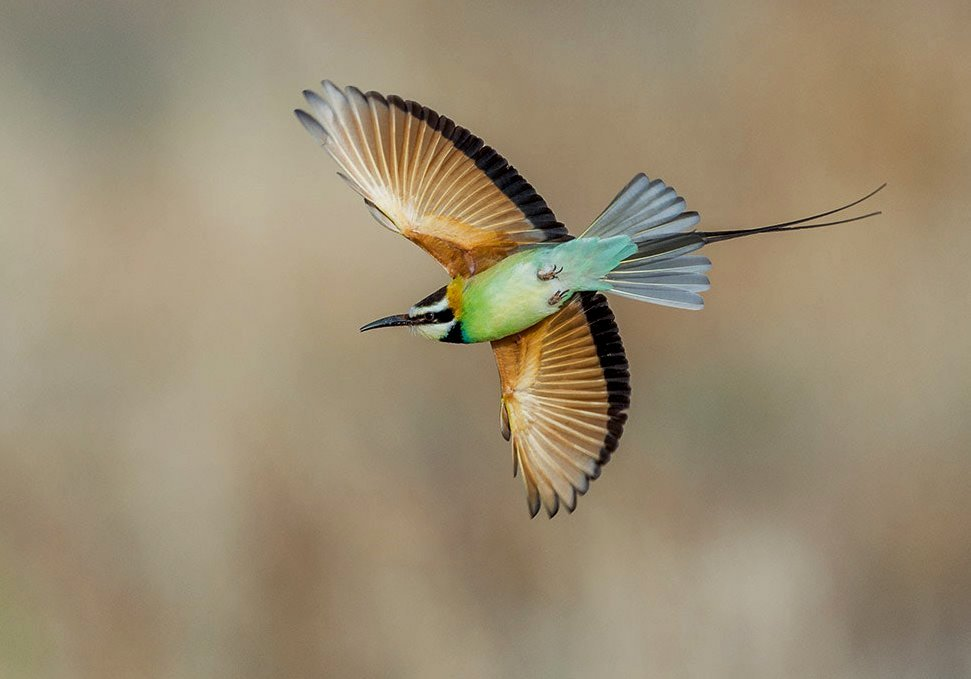
Male in flight

This species, like other bee-eaters, is a richly coloured, slender bird. It is predominantly green, but its face and throat are white with a black crown, eye stripe, and neckband. The underparts are pale green shading to blue on the breast. The eye is red and the beak is black.

The white-throated bee-eater can reach a length of 19–21 cm, excluding the two very elongated central tail feathers, which can exceed an additional length of 12 cm. They weigh between 20 and 28 grams. Sexes are alike, except that the male has longer tail feathers. The call is similar to European bee-eater.

== Habits ==
White-throated bee-eaters also feed and roost communally. As the name suggests, bee-eaters predominantly eat insects, especially bees, wasps and hornets, which are caught in the air by sorties from an open perch. However, this species probably takes mainly flying ants and beetles.

== Nesting ==
The white-throated bee-eater is a bird which breeds in dry sandy open country, such thorn scrub and near-desert. These abundant bee-eaters are gregarious, nesting colonially in sandy banks or open flat areas. They make a relatively long 1–2 m tunnel in which the 6 to 7 spherical white eggs are laid. Both the male and the female take care of the eggs, but up to five helpers also assist with caring for the young.

== Status ==
Widespread and common throughout its large range, the white-throated bee-eater is evaluated as Least Concern on the IUCN Red List of Threatened Species.
