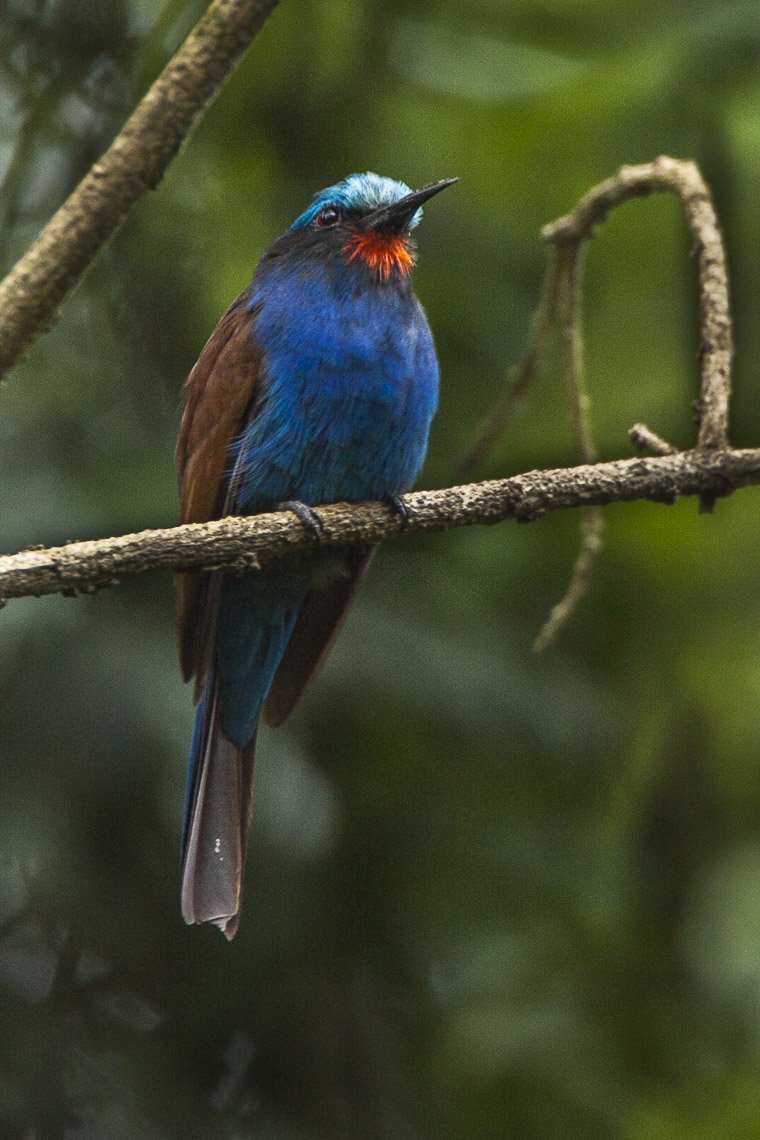

Conservation status
- Least Concern (IUCN 3.1)

Scientific classification
- Kingdom: Animalia
- Phylum: Chordata
- Class: Aves
- Order: Coraciiformes
- Family: Meropidae
- Genus: Merops
- Species: M. muelleri

Binomial name
- Merops muelleri (Cassin, 1857)

= Blue-headed bee-eater =

Blue-headed Bee-eater

Species of bird

The blue-headed bee-eater (Merops muelleri) is a species of bird in the family Meropidae. It is found in forest habitats in tropical West and Central Africa, including in Cameroon, Central African Republic, Republic of the Congo, Democratic Republic of the Congo, Gabon, Equatorial Guinea, and Kenya.

== Description ==
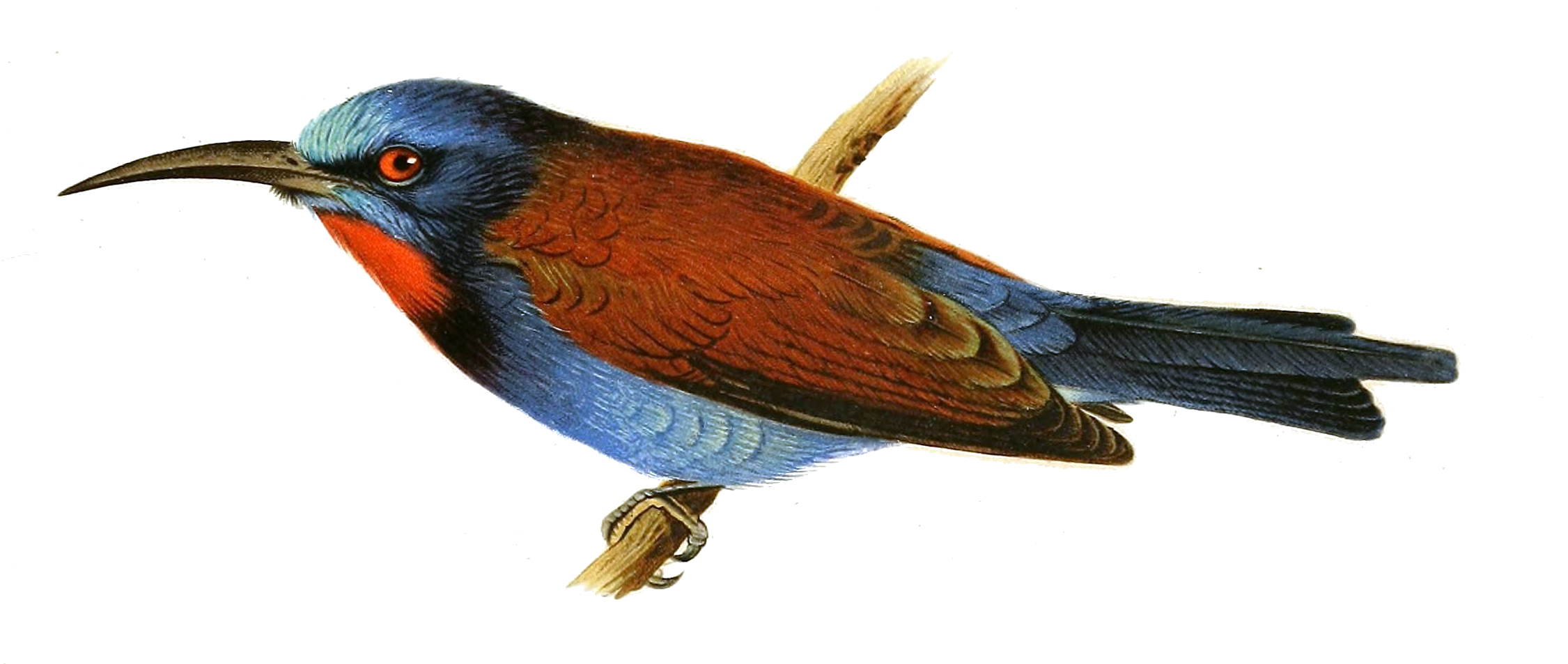
Profile view

The sexes are similar and the length of the adult is about 19 cm (7.5 in). The back and wings are dark brown while the remaining plumage is mostly ultramarine blue. The crown of birds living in the east of the range is blue fading to white on the forehead; western populations have entirely blue heads. The chin and upper throat is scarlet, with a black margin. The belly is a paler shade of blue. The eye is red. In the poor light in the interior of the forest, this bird can be confused with the black bee-eater (Merops gularis).

== Ecology ==
The blue-headed bee-eater is a rainforest bird usually found singly, or sometimes in pairs or trios. It perches on a high branch in the canopy beside tracks and clearings and swoops down on small butterflies, honeybees and other insects before returning to its original perch. The western populations have contracted over the years and the birds are now under threat throughout their range. This is mostly due to human impact through deforestation and cattle grazing.

== Status ==
The blue-headed bee-eater has a very wide range and is a fairly common bird. The population is thought to be declining because of such factors as the degradation of its forest home and over-grazing by cattle. However the total population size is large and the decline trend is slow, so the International Union for Conservation of Nature has assessed the conservation trend of this bird as being of "least concern".
