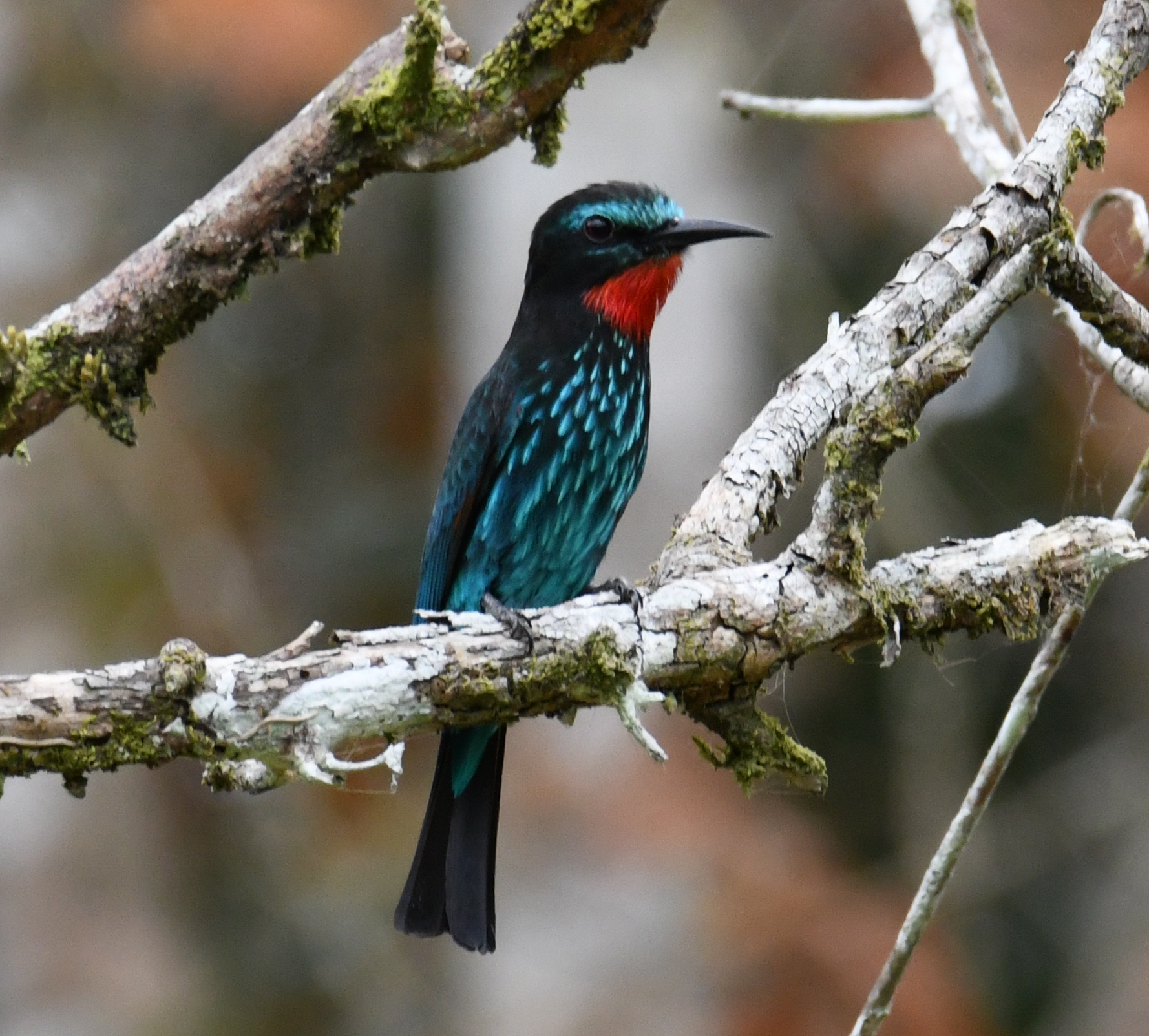
- Black Bee-eater (Merops gularis) in Ghana

Conservation status
- Least Concern (IUCN 3.1)

Scientific classification
- Kingdom: Animalia
- Phylum: Chordata
- Class: Aves
- Order: Coraciiformes
- Family: Meropidae
- Genus: Merops
- Species: M. gularis

Binomial name
- Merops gularis Shaw, 1798

= Black bee-eater =

Species of bird

The black bee-eater (Merops gularis) is a species of bird in the family Meropidae. It is native to the African tropical rainforest where it is found at the edges of the rainforest and in secondary woodland.

== Description ==
The black bee-eater grows to a length of about 20 cm (8 in). It is a predominantly black bird, with a scarlet chin and throat, a streaked breast, a pale blue eyebrow, blue belly, undertail-coverts and rump, and rufous primaries.

== Distribution ==
It is native to the intra-tropical rainforest of Sub-Saharan Africa.

== Subspecies ==
There are two subspecies: M. g. gularis, which is found from Sierra Leone to southeast Nigeria. It has the forehead blue, and a distinct bright cobalt-blue superciliary stripe. Some southeast Nigerian and west Cameroon birds are intermediate between this and M. g. australis, which is found from southeast Nigeria to northeast Democratic Republic of the Congo, south to northern Angola. This sub-species has no superciliary stripe; forehead black, sometimes with a few blue feathers; the light azure-blue streaks on breast and even the belly are sometimes scarlet-tipped. Wing slightly longer than the nominate subspecies.

== Status ==
The black bee-eater has a very wide range and although the population size has not been quantified but it is said to be widespread and common with a large total population, and the International Union for Conservation of Nature has assessed its conservation status as being of "least concern".
