= Prigozhin =

Prigozhin or Prigogine (Russian: Пригожин) is a masculine East Slavic surname originating from the adjective prigozhii, meaning useful, suitable, nice; its feminine counterpart is Prigozhina. The surname may refer to the following notable people:

- Abram Prigozhin (1896—1937), Soviet historian
- Alexandre Prigogine (1913–1991), Russian-born Belgian ornithologist
- Ilya Prigogine (1917–2003), Russian-born Belgian physicist noted for his work on dissipative structures, complex systems, and irreversibility
  - 11964 Prigogine, a minor planet named for Ilya Prigogine
  - Prigogine's theorem, a theorem of thermodynamics of non-equilibrium processes formulated by Ilya Prigogine
- Iosif Prigozhin (born 1969), Russian music producer
- Larisa Prigozhina (1937—2017), Russian theater historian
- Lucian Prigozhin (1926–1994), Soviet composer
- Pavel Prigozhin (born 1998), leader of Wagner Group since 2023
- Yefim Prigozhin (1914–1999), Soviet/Ukrainian scientist and engineer
- Yevgeny Prigozhin (1961–2023), Russian businessman and mercenary commander, founder of Wagner Group
