= Yellow-necked greenbul =

Yellow-necked greenbul may refer to:

- Falkenstein's greenbul, a species of bird found in western and central Africa
- Yellow-bellied greenbul, a species of bird found in eastern, southern, and west-central Africa
