= Antoon Emeric Marcel De Roo =

Belgian ornithologist (1936–1971)

Antoon Emeric Marcel De Roo (born 26 August 1936 in Roeselare; died 25 February 1971) was a Belgian ornithologist.

== Life ==
De Roo was already scientifically active before he received his licentiate in biology from the Katholieke Universiteit Leuven in 1959. Together with his friend Paul Houwen he observed the swift colonies of Roeselare during his student days. In 1954 he became an employee at the Belgian Bird Ringing Center, where he mainly focused on the marking, measurement and examination of moulting birds.

His great interest in the birds of Central Africa brought him in 1962 in contact with Henri Schouteden. This encouraged him in his research and enabled him to study the very extensive ornithological collections of the Royal Museum for Central Africa. He devoted himself above all to the geography and systematics of birds, especially the swift family (Apodidae).

After his military service he went to the Republic of the Congo for three years (1962–1965) as part of development aid, where he participated in the Belgian bird ringing program in Luluabourg (now Kananga). During this time he and Jan Deheegher marked 6,310 birds for the Belgian Vogelberingzentrale, including 648 specimens of 20 palaearctic species and 5,662 specimens of 100 paleotropic species. The results of this ringing action were published in 1965 together with those of Antoon Frans De Bont under the title "Resultats du beguage d'oiseaux en Republique Democratique du Congo et en Republique du Rwanda (1959 à 1965)" in the magazine Le Gerfaut: De Giervalk.

From 1962 to 1971 he was a research assistant at the Royal Museum for Central Africa in Tervuren. From May 1968 to 1971 he was a research assistant at the Laboratory for General Zoology at the University of Antwerp, where he mainly devoted himself to the ornithology of Africa. In 1968 he took part in one of the three Belgian Togo expeditions led by Walter Verheyen. The systematic and geographical analysis of the rich bird collection gathered on these trips was published by him in four papers in the journal Revue de Zoölogie et de Botanique Africaines.

In 1969 he co-authored the studies Contribution a l'Ornithologie de la Republique du Togo and Contribution a l'etude des chiropteres de la Republique du Togo alongside Walter Verheyen and Frits De Vree.

In 1967 De Roo described the Prigogine's greenbul (Chlorocichla prigoginei) and in 1970 the subspecies Apus barbatus serlei of the African black swift. In 1968 he set up the class of scarce swift, Schoutedenapus.

== Dedication names ==
In 1970, the parasitologist Alex Fain described the mite species Knemidokoptes derooi, which causes beak mange in the African palm swift. In 1972 Jan L. J. Hulselmans honored De Roo in the species epithet of the frog species Conraua derooi. In 1975 Alexandre Prigogine named the subspecies Cyanomitra alinae derooi of the blue-headed sunbird after De Roo. In 1978 Erik Van der Straeten and Walter Verheyen described Deroo's mouse (Praomys derooi).
