= Itombwe owl =

Conservation status
- Data Deficient (IUCN 3.1)
- CITES Appendix II

Scientific classification
- Kingdom: Animalia
- Phylum: Chordata
- Class: Aves
- Order: Strigiformes
- Family: Tytonidae
- Genus: Tyto
- Species: T. prigoginei

Binomial name
- Tyto prigoginei (Schouteden, 1952)

Synonyms
- Phodilus prigoginei Schouteden, 1952

Species of owl

The Itombwe owl (Tyto prigoginei) is a species of owl in the barn owl family, Tytonidae. It is restricted to a small area in the Albertine Rift montane forests of east-central Africa.

== Taxonomy and systematics ==
The Itombwe owl was first described by the Belgium naturalist Henri Schouteden in 1952 and given the binomial name Phodilus prigoginei, being placed in the genus Phodilus along with the two Asian bay owls, being referred to as the Congo bay owl or African bay owl. The specific epithet was chosen in honour of the Russian-born mineralogist and ornithologist Alexandre Prigogine who had first brought the owl to Schouteden's attention. The owl is not well known and has been treated as a race of the Oriental bay owl, but this is now considered unlikely, and, in fact, the two species do not appear to be closely related. Even so, its inclusion in Phodilus is rather dubious, and genetic research is required. It is possible that this species may instead be placed in the genus Tyto or even a separate monotypic genus. In 2023, this species was classified into Tyto by the International Ornithological Congress on the basis of morphological similarities.

== Description ==
The Itombwe owl is a small owl with chestnut brown on the upper-parts, black and white spots on the crown and nape, and reddish cream underparts. The only specimens known have been adult females, males and juveniles are therefore unknown. It is smaller than typical barn owls and has a more U-shaped facial disk; its earlike feather tufts are hardly visible. Similar to the Oriental bay owl in plumage colour and pattern, its facial disc is heart-shaped like that of the western barn owl, and either resemblance may be due to convergence.

== Distribution and habitat ==
Map of locations of the two observations from 1951 and 1996 (Butynski et al.)

The type specimen was collected at Muusi, at an altitude of 2,430m, in the Itombwe Mountains in the eastern Democratic Republic of Congo in 1951. It was then unconfirmed until a second individual was captured in a mist net in 1996 in the south east corner of the Itombwe Mountains, some 95 km south of, and 600m, lower than the collection site of the type specimen. Both of the specimens captured were taken in similar habitat of montane forest interspersed with areas of grassland and stands of bamboo.

In addition there was a possible sighting in Burundi in 1974, and recordings of an unidentified owl made in Rwanda in 1990 may have been from this species.

== Conservation ==
The biology of the Itombwe owl is almost completely unknown as is its population size or even its complete geographic range. Conservation efforts cannot start without this research. It is threatened by the clearing of its habitat for small scale agriculture as well as by logging, mining, wildfires and forest clearance. The Itombwe Forest has recently been proposed as a community reserve, but its boundaries still require defining. The Itombwe Nature Reserve was established, but enforcement has been lacking, as the expected development in infrastructure, tourism, and jobs did not materialize. Nonetheless, the forest remains relatively intact.
