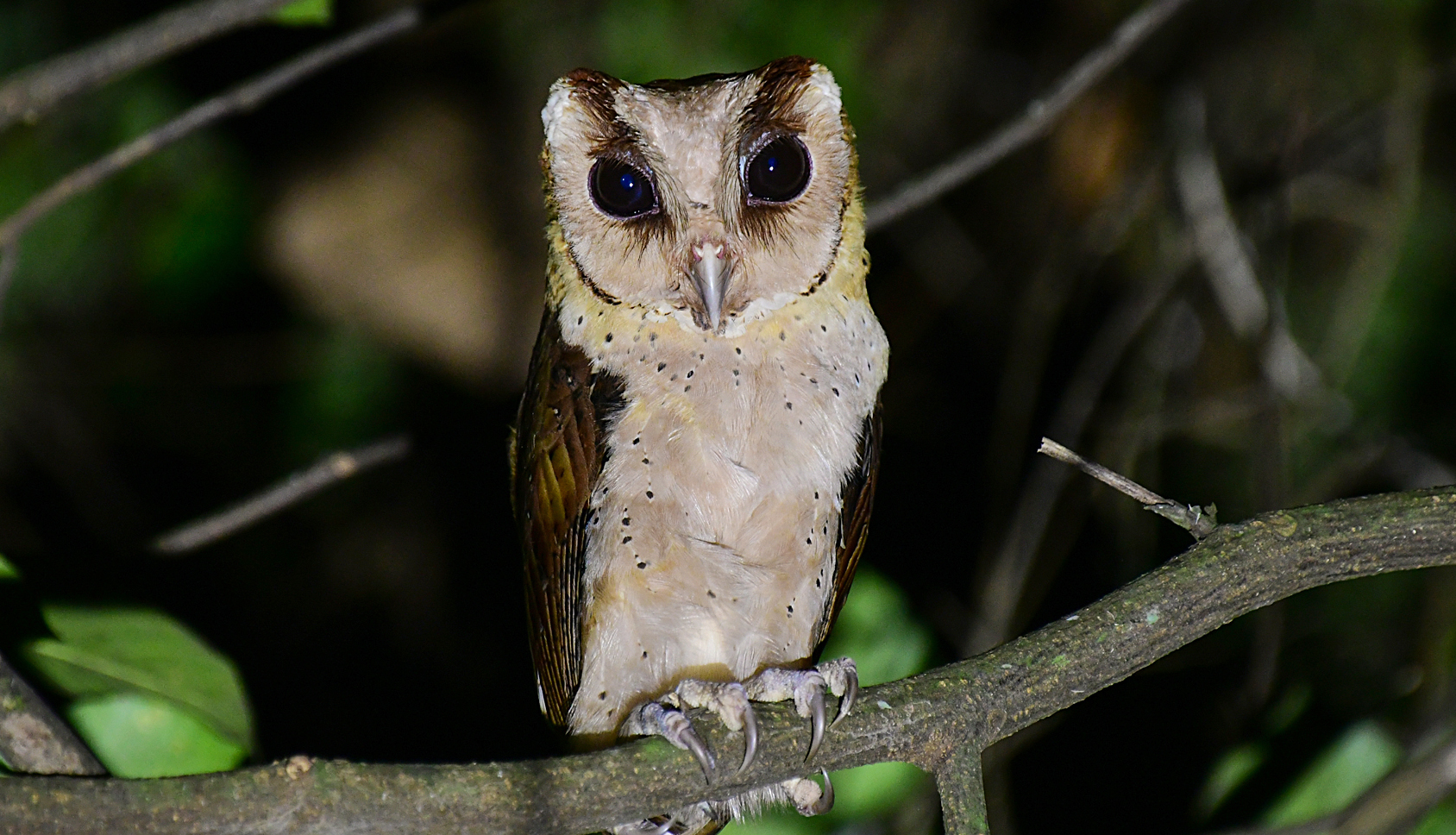

Conservation status
- Least Concern (IUCN 3.1)
- CITES Appendix II

Scientific classification
- Kingdom: Animalia
- Phylum: Chordata
- Class: Aves
- Order: Strigiformes
- Family: Tytonidae
- Genus: Phodilus
- Species: P. assimilis

Binomial name
- Phodilus assimilis Hume, 1877
- Distribution map of Sri Lanka Bay Owl

Audio
- Song of Phodilus assimilis ripleyi alongside with Raochestes nerostagona

= Sri Lanka bay owl =

Species of owl

The Sri Lanka bay owl (Phodilus assimilis) is a species of bay owl in the family Tytonidae. It is endemic to the island of Sri Lanka and the Western Ghats in Kerala, South Western India. It was considered a subspecies of the Oriental bay owl (Phodilus badius) but is now treated as a full species due to its distinctive call, plumage and disjunct distribution.

Its natural habitats are subtropical or tropical moist montane forests and subtropical or tropical high-altitude grassland. It is threatened by habitat loss.

== Taxonomy ==
The Sri Lanka bay owl was described by the English politician and naturalist Allan Octavian Hume in 1873 but it was only in 1877 that he introduced the binomial name Phodilus assimilis. The genus name Phodilus is from the Ancient Greek phōs for "light" or "daylight" and deilos for "timid" or "cowardly". The specific epithet assimilis is the Latin for "similar" or "like".

It was earlier considered a subspecies of the Oriental bay owl Phodilus badius, but now treated as a separate species based on differences in call and plumage.

Two subspecies are recognised:

- Phodilus assimilis ripleyi Hussain & Reza Khan, 1978 - Western Ghats
- Phodilus assimilis assimilis A. O. Hume, 1877 – Central & southern Sri Lanka

The Indian subspecies is found along the Western Ghats mostly south of Goa but as they are secretive, records are rare and their presence has often been detected only upon the discovery of injured individuals. The breeding season is in winter when the distinctive song consisting of multiple whistles with inflections can be heard.

== Gallery ==
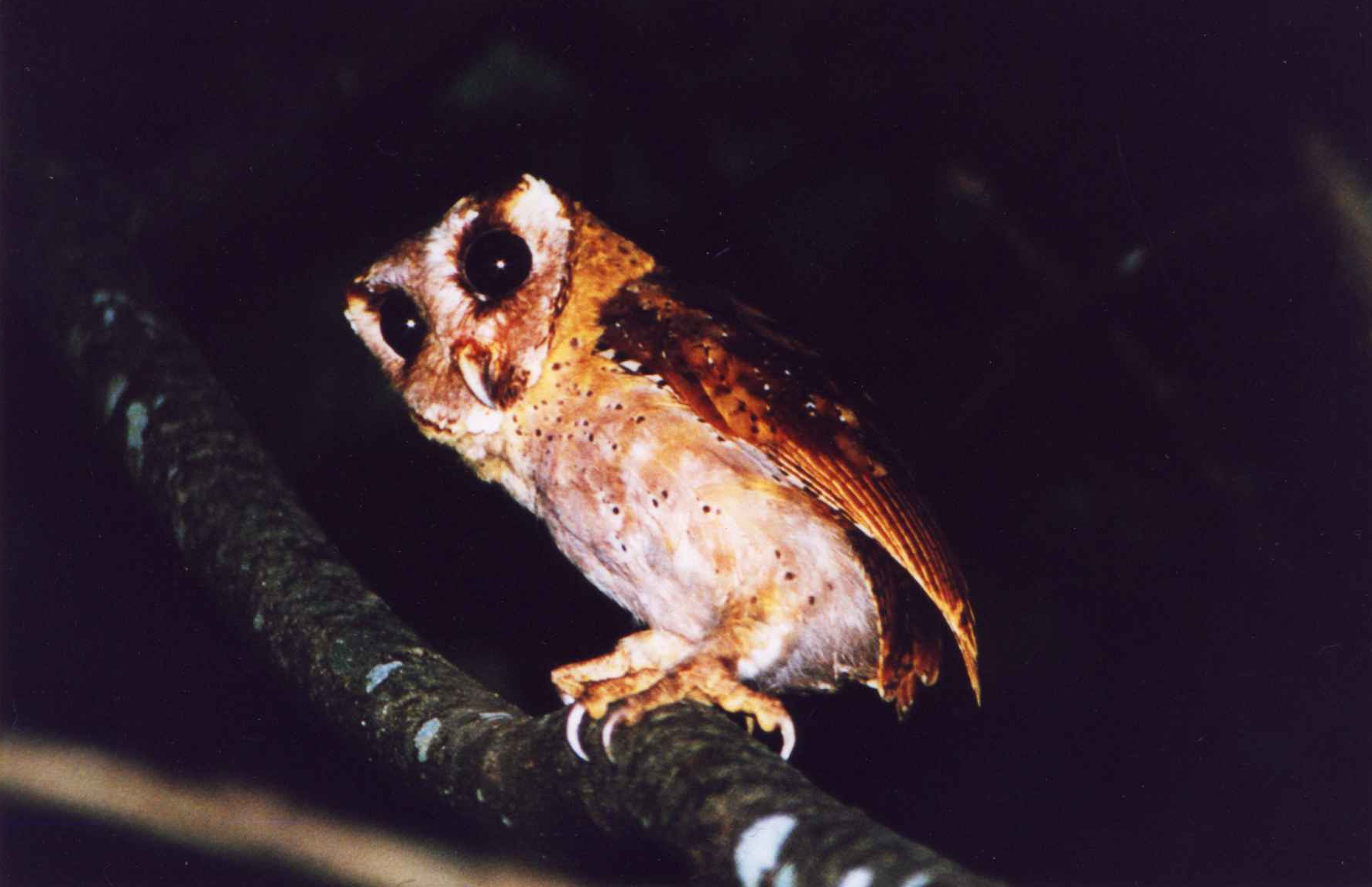
Phodilus assimilis in Kalakad Mundanthurai Tiger Reserve

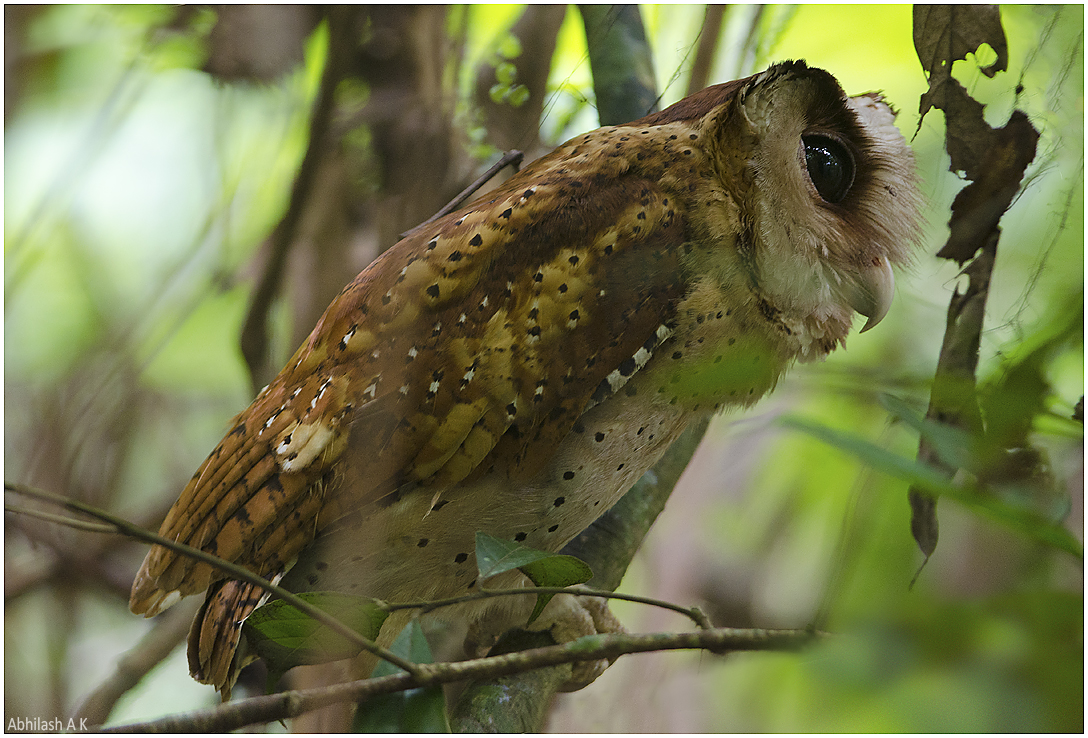
Sri Lanka bay owl at Arippa forest, Trivandrum, Kerala, India

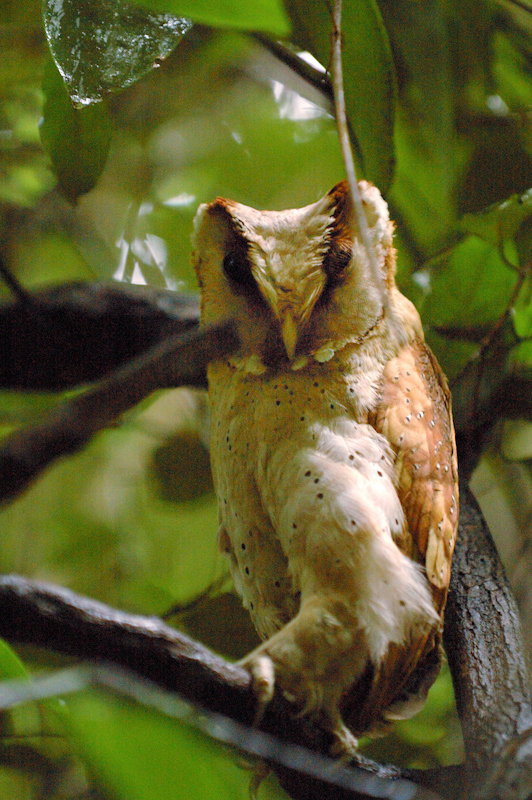
In Top Slip, Anamalai Hills, Tamil Nadu
