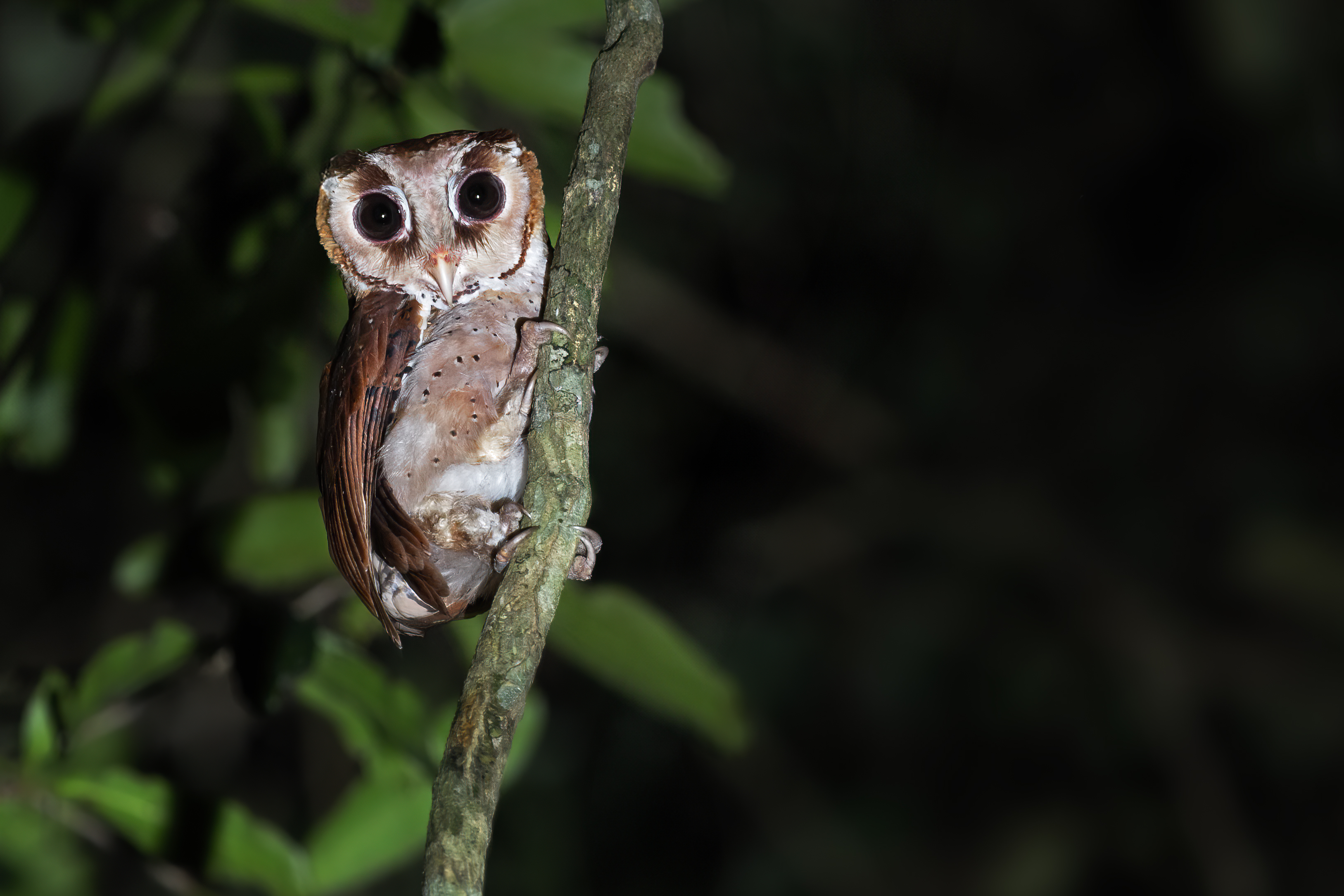
- At the Cat Tien National Park, Vietnam

Conservation status
- Least Concern (IUCN 3.1)
- CITES Appendix II

Scientific classification
- Kingdom: Animalia
- Phylum: Chordata
- Class: Aves
- Order: Strigiformes
- Family: Tytonidae
- Genus: Phodilus
- Species: P. badius

Binomial name
- Phodilus badius (Horsfield, 1821)

Subspecies
- P. b. badius (Southeast Asian bay owl); P. b. saturatus (Sikkim bay owl); P. b. ripleyi (Peninsular bay owl); P. b. arixuthus (Natuna bay owl); P. b. parvus (Belitung bay owl)

= Oriental bay owl =

Species of owl

The Oriental bay owl (Phodilus badius) is a species of bay owl. It is completely nocturnal, and can be found throughout Southeast Asia and parts of India. It has several subspecies. It has a heart-shaped face with earlike extensions. The Congo bay owl (Phodilus prigoginei) was formerly classified as a subspecies of Oriental bay owl due to insufficient knowledge, but it has turned out that it might not even belong to the same genus. The Sri Lanka bay owl was also considered a subspecies.

A population of this species has apparently become extinct on Samar Island in the Philippines during the 20th century. It was described as Phodilus badius riverae and was only ever known from a single specimen, which was lost in a bombing raid in 1945. The validity of this taxon is uncertain; it is usually synonymized with the nominate subspecies (for reasons of biogeography) or the subspecies saturatus (from external appearance); it might have been a distinct species, however.

== Taxonomy ==
Four subspecies are recognized:

- Phodilus badius arixuthus Oberholser, 1932
- Phodilus badius badius (Horsfield, 1821)
- Phodilus badius parvus Chasen, 1937
- Phodilus badius saturatus Robinson, 1927

== Description ==
Individuals are small, with distinguishing features such as highly angular heads. The top and back half of their bodies are a deep chestnut color while the bottom of their bodies as well as their stomachs are a cream and tanish color. Oriental bay owls have large, striking black eyes which are highlighted due to the color contrast of their faces. Being that they are small and typically stand upright, they are very difficult to spot as they find comfort in their vast range of habitats. Their ability to resonate is remarkable, for they not only hoot, but also scream and create high pitched whistle songs. Their songs typically consist of four to seven melancholic whistles, lasting anywhere between two and eight seconds, and the pitch slightly increases towards the end. They sometimes alternate with a shorter whistle, that goes kleet-kleet-kleet or kleek-kleek-kleek, when moving between places.

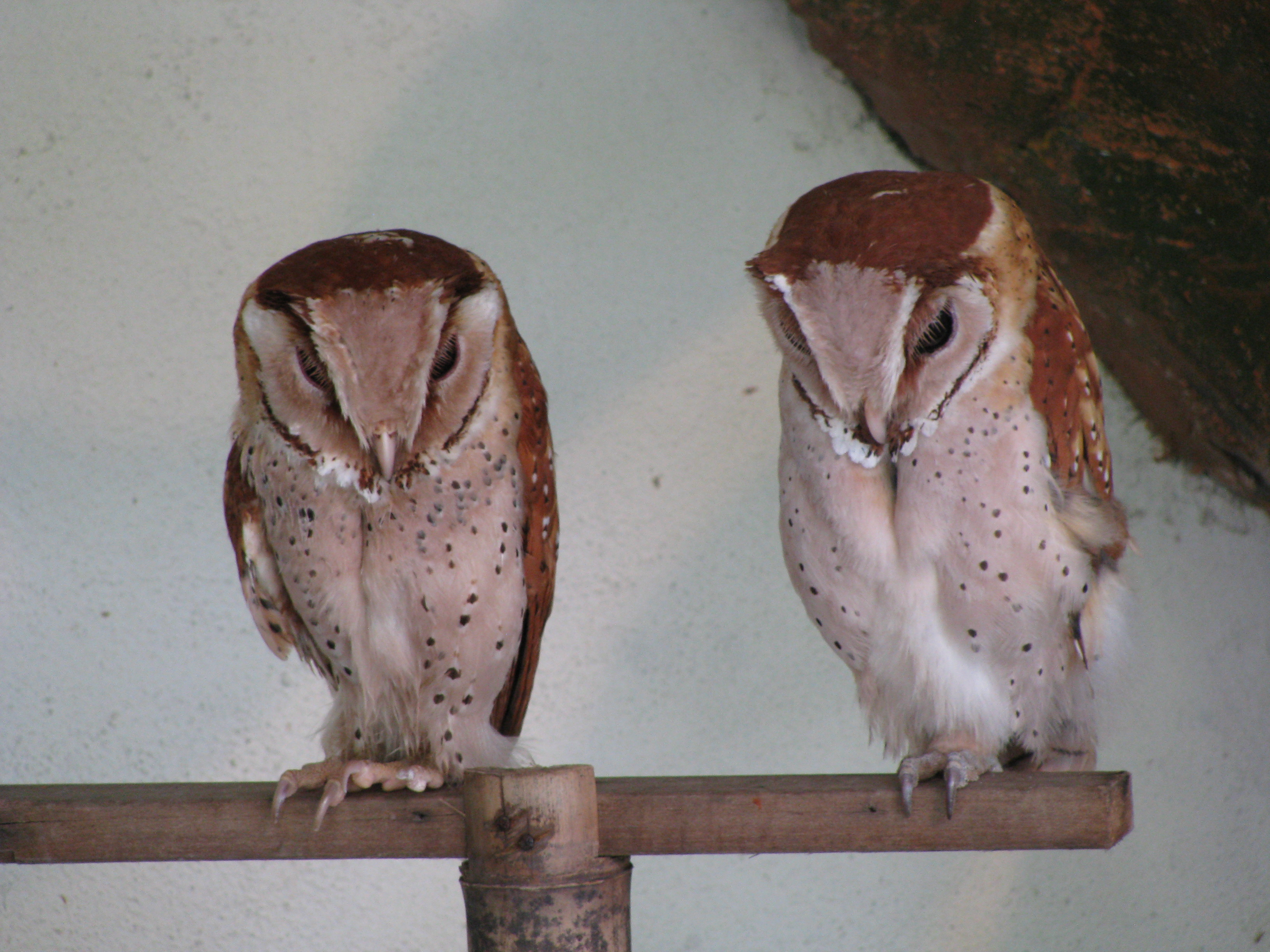
Two Oriental bay owls looking down at people trying to take photographs of them

Total body length is 22.5–29 cm, wing length 172–237 mm, and tail length 168–239 mm. The weight range is 255–308 g.

Females are often larger than the males of this species.

== Distribution ==
The Oriental bay owl is typically found and distributed throughout Nepal, Sikkim, Assam, Nagaland, Manipur, Burma and Thailand, east to south China, and south through the Malay Peninsula to the Greater Sundas. They are most comfortable living in woodland, plantations and mangrove swamps at altitudes of up to 7,220 feet (2,200 meters), leading to them being scattered around India, Thailand, Singapore, the Philippines and other parts of Southeast Asia.

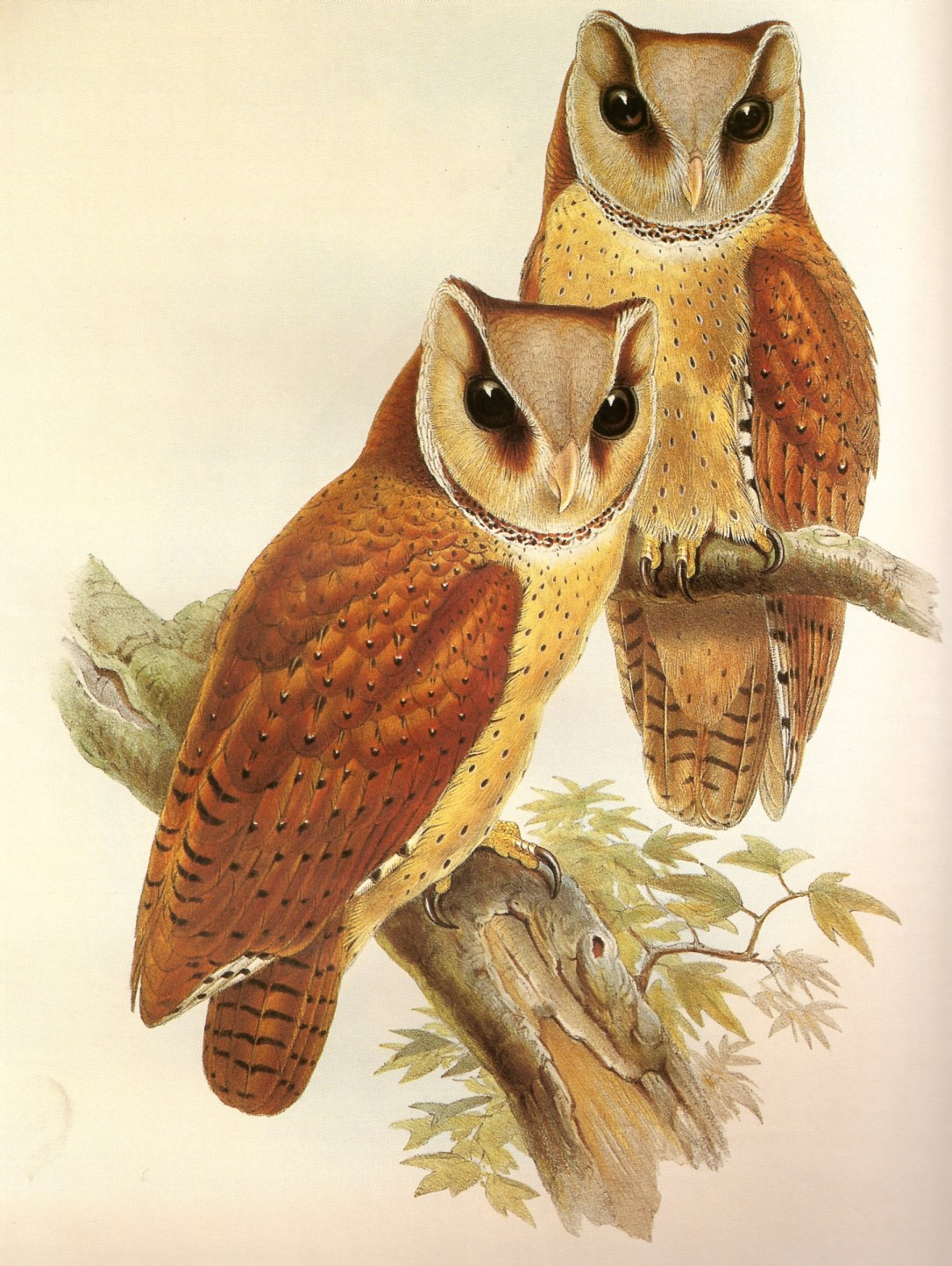
Illustration from "Birds of Asia" (1867-1872)

== Habitat and ecology ==
The Oriental bay owl is very scarcely known, even in its area of origin. It is prevalent in the tropical moist forests as well as in southeast Asia. The species can be seen in the tropical wet evergreen forest as high altitudes reaching heights of 1,040-1,050m above sea level. These sightings of the owl are rare and occurred between February and June 1998 in Sengaltheri, Tamil Nadu, India. Also located in the evergreen forest of India. There are not many in the population, and so they are not very well known. Their habitat is in two separate locations in India: northern in the Himalayan foothills and that general location, and in the southern areas, including the southern Western Ghats of Kerala/Tamil Nadu, as well as some areas of Sri Lanka (specifically the wetlands). This owl tends to be nocturnal and stays to itself. This owl tends to reside at high elevations ranging from 200 m to a peak of ,2300 m according to area in which it lives. At the foothills it tends to stay at areas between 200–1,000 m elevation, but due to destruction of many of the foothills/ forests in the area (caused by mankind), some of the owls reside at higher altitudes reaching the peak of 2,300 m in montane forests.

=== Breeding habits ===
This species is caring towards their offspring; both the male and female care for their young. Incubation lasts for approximately 36–42 days and there is usually a 100 percent survival rate for the zygote. The babies are quick to develop and are protected by both parents. They are more protective of the nestlings (young chicks) than of the older chicks. They feed their offspring an assortment of lizards, frogs, rodents and on occasion, insects.

Breeding time is usually from the months of March, April and May. The eggs tend to be laid between March and July. They tend to nest in hollowed out tree trunks as well as any other hole it can find. They can sometimes be found nesting in palms in Java. Around 3 to 5 eggs are laid; the appearance of the eggs are white and rather small. The measurements of the eggs on the oblong portion are around 38–40.6 mm and on the smaller portion of the egg, the circumference is approximately 30–31 mm. Although both parents care for the offspring, only the mother incubates the egg starting at the 2 day mark. The father is the one who hunts and brings nourishment back for the offspring.

== Diet ==
The Oriental bay owls prey upon small rodents, bats, birds, snakes, frogs, lizards, magpies and large arthropods such as beetles, grasshoppers, and spiders. This species hunts from a perch and flies through trees in order to catch their prey. Due to their short and rounded wings, this makes hunting easier, especially by the water. Being that the owls find themselves most comfortable in Southeast Asia and parts of India, they are surrounded by a very humid and tropical climate. This offers the species an immense food source and trees to hunt from. The owl feeds its young an assortment of rodents, lizards and frogs when caring for them.
