= Prigogine's nightjar =

Conservation status
- Data Deficient (IUCN 3.1)

Scientific classification
- Kingdom: Animalia
- Phylum: Chordata
- Class: Aves
- Clade: Strisores
- Order: Caprimulgiformes
- Family: Caprimulgidae
- Genus: Caprimulgus
- Species: C. prigoginei

Binomial name
- Caprimulgus prigoginei Louette, 1990

Species of bird

Prigogine's nightjar (Caprimulgus prigoginei) or the Itombwe nightjar, is a bird species of tropical central Africa. It is known from only one specimen taken at Malenge in the Itombwe Mountains in Belgian Congo in August 1955.

It appears to be a forest species, but nothing is known of its habits or breeding, although it is likely to nest on bare ground like its relatives. It is assumed to be a nocturnal insectivore like other nightjars.

Prigogine's nightjar is a small nightjar at 19 cm, short-tailed and large-headed. The adult female is dark brown with heavy speckling. In flight it is again mainly brown, without the white wing marking found in many of its relatives. There are pale brown wing spots, and whitish tail feather tips. The male is unknown.

The male's song is unknown, but unidentified nightjar calls heard in the breeding area include a rapid churring and a knocking sound.

The common name and binomial commemorates the ornithologist Alexandre Prigogine.
