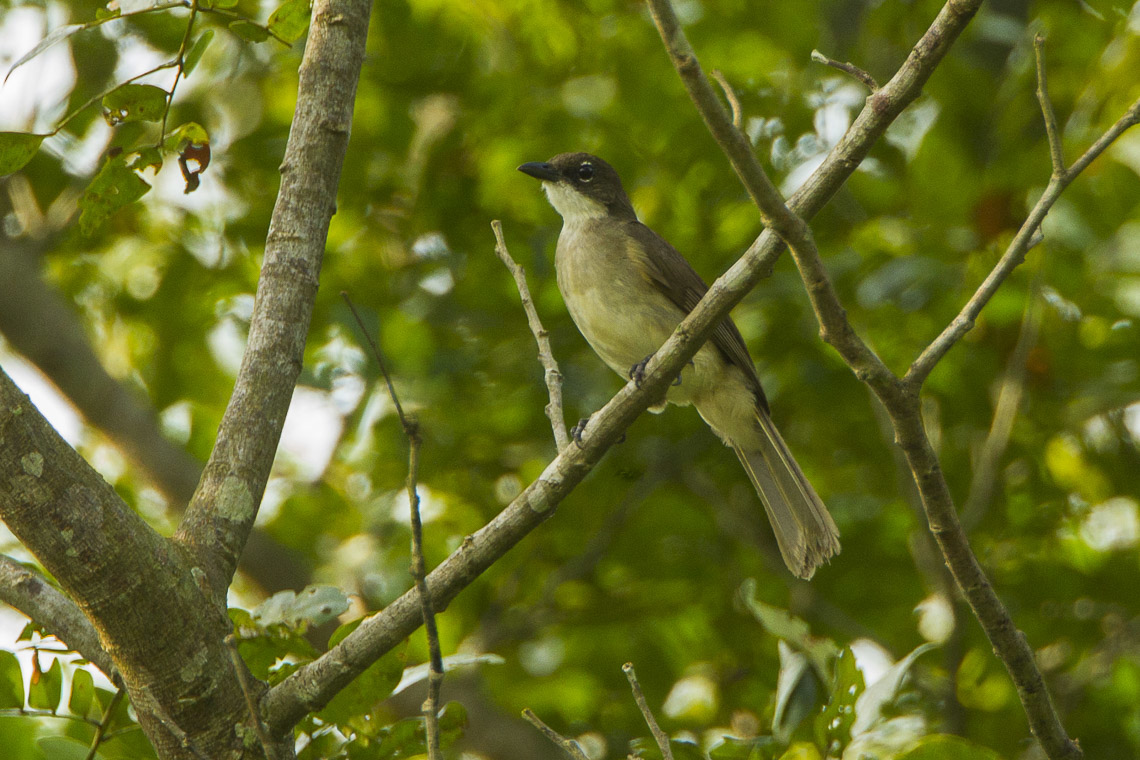

Conservation status
- Least Concern (IUCN 3.1)

Scientific classification
- Kingdom: Animalia
- Phylum: Chordata
- Class: Aves
- Order: Passeriformes
- Family: Pycnonotidae
- Genus: Chlorocichla
- Species: C. simplex

Binomial name
- Chlorocichla simplex (Hartlaub, 1855)
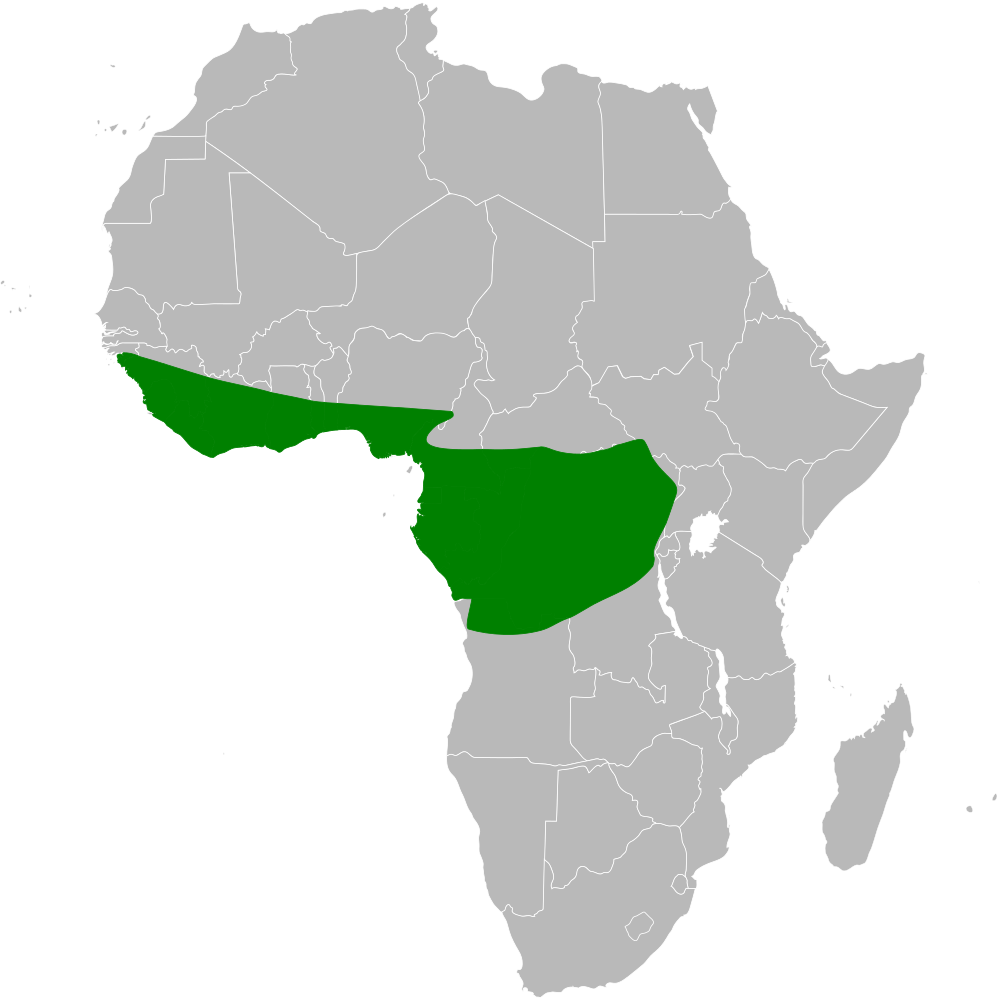

Synonyms
- Pyrrhurus simplex; Trichophorus simplex

= Simple greenbul =

Species of songbird (Chlorocichla simplex)

The simple greenbul (Chlorocichla simplex) or simple leaflove, is a species of songbird in the bulbul family of passerine birds. It is widespread throughout the African tropical rainforest. Its natural habitats are subtropical or tropical dry forests, subtropical or tropical moist lowland forests, and subtropical or tropical moist shrubland.

== Taxonomy and systematics ==
The simple greenbul was originally described in the genus Trichophorus (a synonym for Criniger) and then classified within Pyrrhurus before being moved to the genus Chlorocichla.
