= Harry Friedmann =

Israeli chemist (1931–2018)

- הארי פרידמן
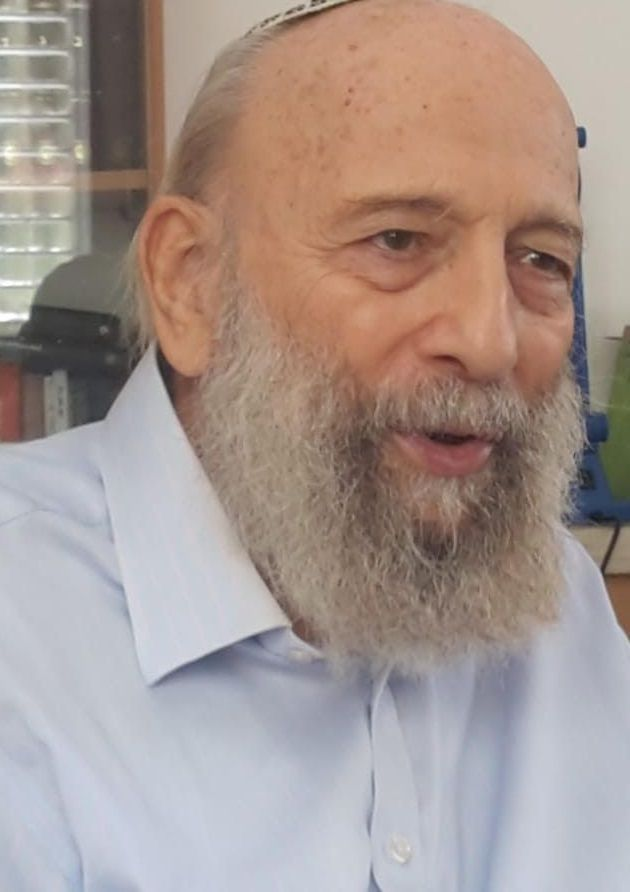
- Born: 28 November 1931; Frankfurt am Main
- Died: 28 May 2018 (aged 86); Israel
- Citizenship: Israeli
- Education: Université libre de Bruxelles
- Scientific career
- Fields: Theoretical Nonlinear Optics, Lasers in Biology
- Workplaces: Bar Ilan University
- Doctoral advisor: Ilya Prigogine

Harry Friedmann (Hebrew: הארי פרידמן; 28 November 1931 – 28 May 2018) was a professor of chemistry who specialized in theoretical nonlinear optics and lasers in biology.

== Biography ==
Harry Friedmann (1931–2018) was born in Frankfurt am Main to Miriam (Manya) and Moshe Friedmann. Soon after his birth, the family fled to Czechoslovakia to the area that was called the Sudetenland and from there to Belgium. He studied at the Université libre de Bruxelles from 1951, gaining a Ph.D. with distinction in 1964 under the supervision of Nobel prize winner Ilya Prigogine. He was a research associate at the Weizmann Institute of Science (1962–1967), a senior lecturer at the Technion – Israel Institute of Technology (1967–1969) and then a professor at Bar-Ilan University in the Chemistry Department. He became a professor emeritus at Bar-Ilan University in 1999. Friedmann was married to Josephine and had two children, Jacqueline Perle and Daniel, and five grandchildren.

== Scientific interests and publications ==
His research focused on quantum statistical mechanics, spectroscopy of molecules in rare-gas crystals, theoretical nonlinear optics, especially isotope separation, nonlinear optical processes in atomic systems, light propagation and storage, and also the effect of laser light on biological systems.

He published over 120 papers in peer-reviewed journals, many of them co-authored by colleagues Arlene Wilson-Gordon and Rachel Lubart.
