= Albertine owlet =

Conservation status
- Near Threatened (IUCN 3.1)
- CITES Appendix II

Scientific classification
- Kingdom: Animalia
- Phylum: Chordata
- Class: Aves
- Order: Strigiformes
- Family: Strigidae
- Genus: Glaucidium
- Species: G. albertinum

Binomial name
- Glaucidium albertinum Prigogine, 1983

Species of owl

The Albertine owlet (Glaucidium albertinum) or Prigogine's owlet, is a small species of small owl in the family Strigidae, native to the Albertine Rift montane forests.

== Taxonomy ==
Some authorities include the Albertine owlet as a subspecies of the African barred owlet, but others, including Birdlife, treat it as a separate species.

== Description ==
The Albertine owlet is very similar to the African barred owlet (Glaucidium capense) and is a small, large-headed owl with no "ear-tufts". The head is heavily spotted with whitish flecks, the upper parts are maroon-brown and the mantle and back are not barred. The chin, throat and upper breasts are maroon with broad creamy bars, and the rest of the underparts are off-white with dark chestnut spots, mainly on the flanks. The tail is brown with large white spots. The eyes are pale yellow. The body length is 20 cm (7.9 in).

== Distribution and habitat ==
The Albertine owlet is known from just a few specimens, two were collected in the Itombwe Mountains (two specimens) and two more in forest west of Lake Edward at 1,100 m (3,600 ft) in altitude in eastern Democratic Republic of Congo, as well as one in Nyungwe Forest in western Rwanda. There has also been a sight record from Kahuzi-Biéga National Park, west of Lake Kivu in the Democratic Republic of Congo (DRC). The Albertine owlet occurs in very open montane forest and its ecotone where there are many clearings and a dense undergrowth. It probably occurs at elevations of up to 2,500 m (8,200 ft).

== Behaviour ==
Little is known about the behaviour of the Albertine owlet. The stomach of one of the specimens contained a beetle and a grasshopper.

== Conservation status ==
Deforestation and forest degradation are the most likely threats within the range of the Albertine owlet. The forest in the Itombwe Mountains and Kahuzi-Biéga National Park is under increasing pressure from agricultural clearance and grazing, timber cutting, mining and hunting. The range lies within a conflict-ridden region with thousands of refugees in camps, though this also seems to have resulted in outward emigration, leaving areas depopulated as well. More needs to be known about the biology and status of this taxon.
