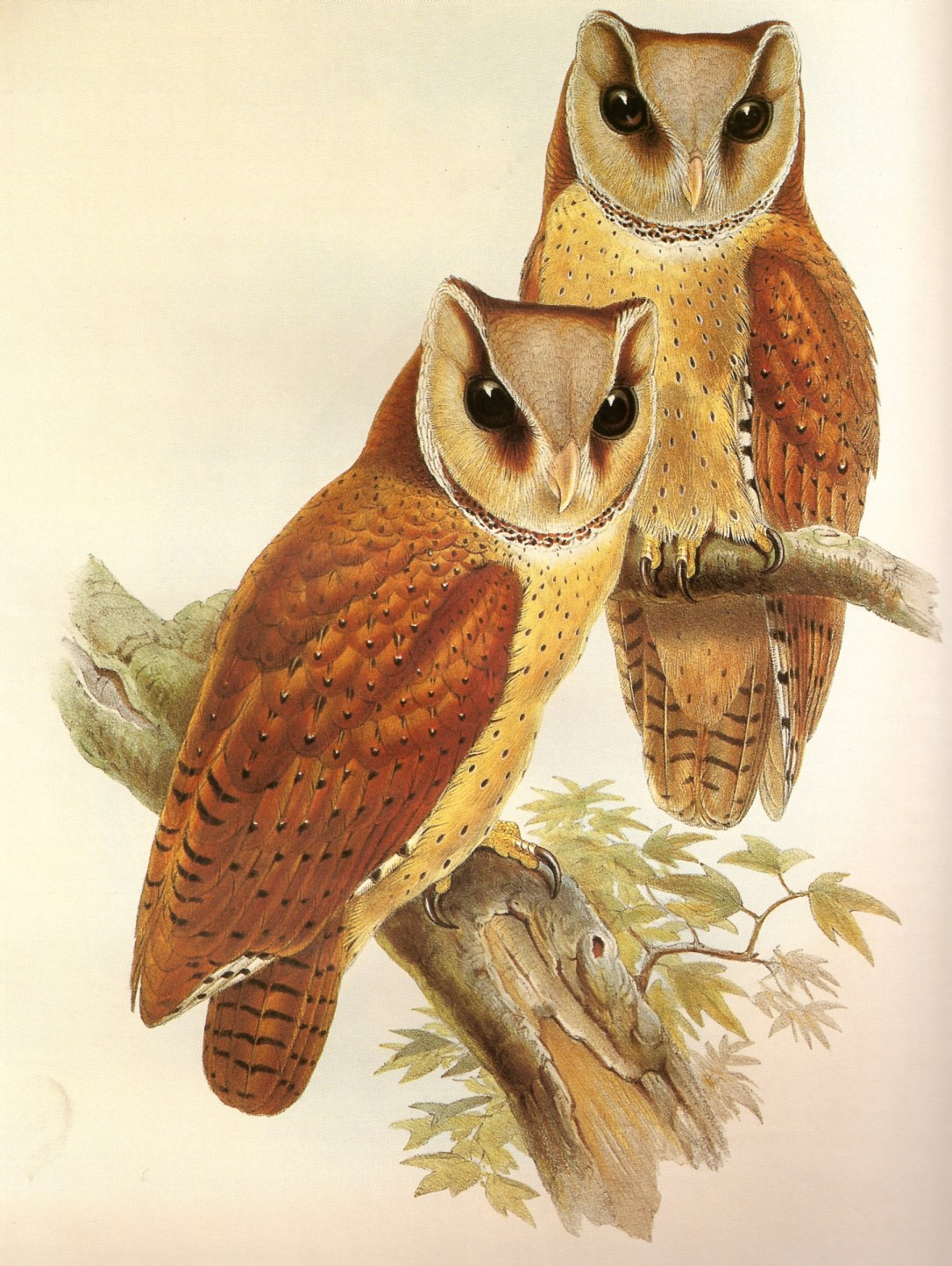
- Oriental bay owl

Scientific classification
- Kingdom: Animalia
- Phylum: Chordata
- Class: Aves
- Order: Strigiformes
- Family: Tytonidae
- Genus: Phodilus; Geoffroy Saint-Hilaire, I, 1830

Species
- P. badius (Horsfield, 1821); P. assimilis Hume 1877

Synonyms
- Photodilus

= Bay owl =

Genus of birds

The bay owls (Phodilus) are a genus of Old World owls in the family Tytonidae. The defining characteristics of bay owls are their smaller bodies, in comparison to the barn owls Tyto in the same family, and their U- or V-shaped faces. These owls can be found across southern Asia from southern India and Sri Lanka to Indonesia within forest and grassland ecosystems.

== Taxonomy and systematics ==
The genus Phodilus was described by the French zoologist Isidore Geoffroy Saint-Hilaire in 1830. Most taxonomists include two extant species in the genus; a third formerly included has now been transferred to Tyto. The name is from the Ancient Greek phōs for "light" or "daylight" and deilos for "timid" or "cowardly".

| Image | Scientific name | Common name | Distribution |
|---|---|---|---|
| | Phodilus badius | Oriental bay owl | Philippines, China, Vietnam, Myanmar, Cambodia, Laos, Thailand, the far northeast of India, Bangladesh, Malaysia, Singapore, Indonesia and Brunei |
| | Phodilus assimilis | Sri Lanka bay owl | Sri Lanka and the Western Ghats in Kerala, southwestern India |

The Itombwe owl (Tyto prigoginei) was formerly classified in this genus as the Congo bay owl, but morphological evidence shows that it is a member of the genus Tyto.

== Description ==
Although bay owls are typically smaller at 22–29 cm (8.7–11.4 in) long, they bear some resemblance to the barn owls. Other characteristics of the bay owl are groupings of feathers that resemble ears, and a divided face disk. Bay owls have also been described as having U-or V-shaped faces. The wings are rounded; they and their tail are chestnut-brown, with a few narrow, dark bars. Their tarsi, or leg/foot bones, are relatively short and fully feathered to the joint. Their toes are yellowish-brown with pale claws. Their throat has a creamy colour and their underparts are often a pale yellowish-brown, with speckles of blackish-brown.

== Distribution and habitat ==
The bay owls can be found in regions from India to Southeast Asia and Indonesia. It is uncertain where their ancestors lived. A 2026 phylogeny put the common ancestor of the bay owls and Tyto, at around 32.9 million years ago, in the Oligocene. These owls can be found in both forests and grasslands, but are fairly scattered in their distribution. However, their primary habitat is within dense evergreen forests, where the owls may roost during the day in the opening of tree trunks or branches sheltered by palm tree leaves. They are often found roosting no more than 2 m (6 ft 7 in) off the ground. They are most vulnerable in this state and not very alert.
