= Linda Reichl =

Statistical physicist

Linda Elizabeth Reichl (born 1942) is a statistical physicist who works in the Center for Complex Quantum Systems at the University of Texas at Austin, and is known for her research on quantum chaos.

== Education ==
Reichl completed her Ph.D. in 1969 at the University of Denver with the dissertation Microscopic Theory of Quasiparticle Spin Fluctations in a Fermi Liquid. She was advised by Elizabeth R. Tuttle and Ilya Prigogine.

== Books ==
Reichl's books include:

- A Modern Course in Statistical Physics (University of Texas Press, 1980; 4th ed., Wiley, 2016)
- The Transition to Chaos: Conservative Systems and Quantum Manifestations (Springer, 1992; 2nd ed., 2004)

She is also the co-editor of several volumes of collected papers.

== Recognition ==
Reichl became a Fellow of the American Physical Society in 2000 "for her original contributions to the field of quantum chaos".
