= Center for Complex Quantum Systems =

Research institute

The Center for Complex Quantum Systems is a research institute within the Department of Physics of The University of Texas at Austin in the United States.

The center, founded in 1967 by Ilya Prigogine, is dedicated to the theoretical and computational research of complex systems, statistical mechanics and chaos theory.

The current research staff includes William C. Schieve and Linda Reichl, the center's director.
