= Alexandre Prigogine =

Belgian mineralogist and ornithologist (1913–1991)

- Born: Abram Ruvimovich Prigozhin; 12 April 1913; Moscow, Russia
- Died: 7 May 1991 (aged 78); Brussels, Belgium
- Education: Free University of Brussels
- Relatives: Ilya Prigogine (brother)
- Scientific career
- Fields: Ornithology

Alexandre Prigogine (born Abram Ruvimovich Prigozhin; Russian: Абрам Рувимович Пригожин; 12 April (N.S. 25 April) 1913 – 7 May 1991) was a Belgian mineralogist and ornithologist of Russian origin.

== Life ==
Born into a Jewish family in Moscow, his father Ruvim Abramovich Prigogine (1884–1974) was a student of chemical engineering and his mother Yulia Leivikovna Vikhman (1892–?), a pianist and student at Moscow Conservatory. His younger brother Ilya Prigogine later won a Nobel Prize in Chemistry. In 1921, the family left Russia and travelled through Lithuania and Germany to settle in Belgium in 1929. After studying chemistry at the Université libre de Bruxelles he moved to the Belgian Congo in 1938 to study its mineral wealth.

Henri Schouteden convinced him in 1946 to take an interest in birds and to collect specimens in the east of the Belgian Congo. This new interest led to him publishing 94 papers on ornithology and he collected nearly 20,000 specimens. He described several new species including Albertine owlet (Glaucidium albertinum), Kabobo apalis (Apalis kaboboensis) and the Itombwe flycatcher (Muscicapa itombwensis) and about 30 new subspecies. Itombwe owl (Tyto prigoginei), Prigogine's nightjar (Caprimulgus prigoginei), Prigogine's double-collared sunbird (Cinnyris prigoginei) and Prigogine's greenbul (Chlorocichla prigoginei) have been named after him.
