= Prigogine's greenbul =

Conservation status
- Data Deficient (IUCN 3.1)

Scientific classification
- Kingdom: Animalia
- Phylum: Chordata
- Class: Aves
- Order: Passeriformes
- Family: Pycnonotidae
- Genus: Chlorocichla
- Species: C. prigoginei

Binomial name
- Chlorocichla prigoginei De Roo, 1967
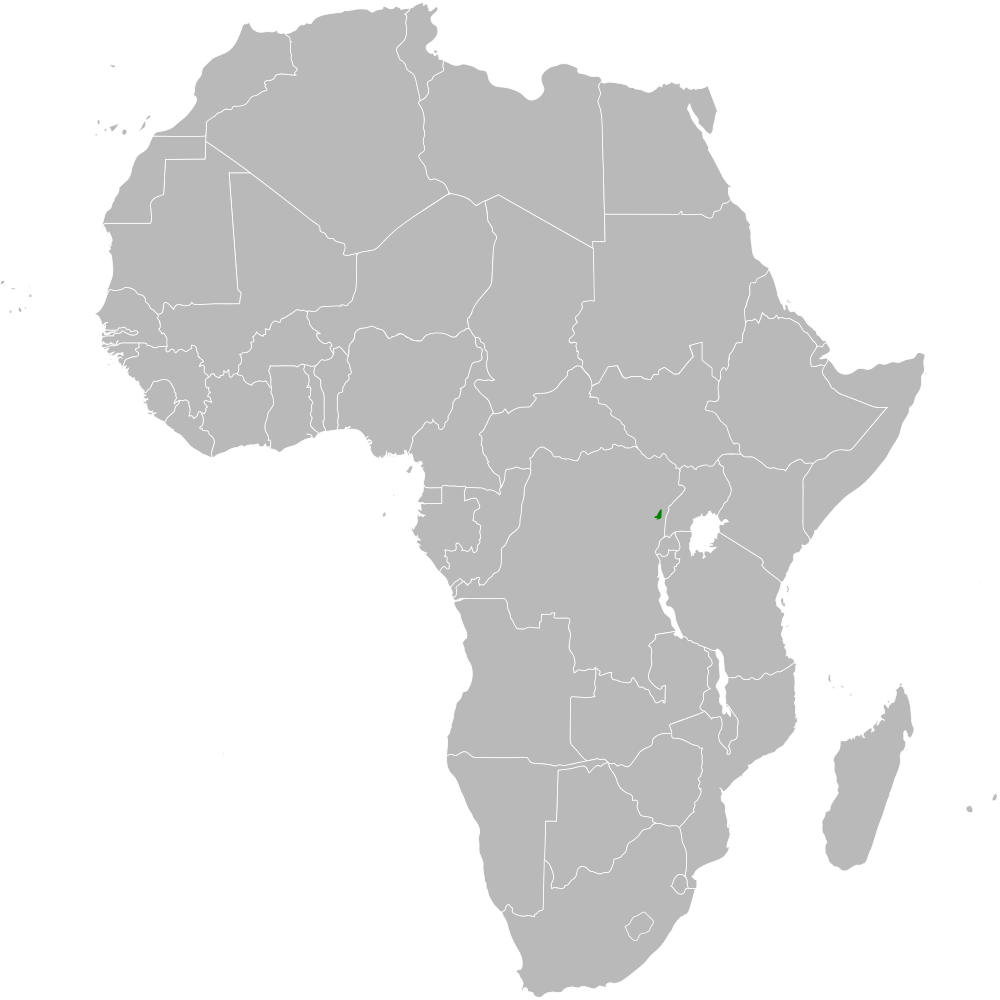

Species of songbird

Prigogine's greenbul (Chlorocichla prigoginei) is a species of songbird in the bulbul family, Pycnonotidae. It is found only in eastern Democratic Republic of the Congo.

Its natural habitat is subtropical or tropical moist montane forests. It is threatened by habitat loss.

== Taxonomy and systematics ==
Prigogine's bulbul is one of five species of bulbul in the genus Chlorocichla. It was originally described as Chlorocichla prigoginei by Antoon de Roo in 1967. The generic name Chlorocichla comes from the Greek χλωρος (khlōros), meaning yellow, and κιχλη (kikhlē), meaning thrush. The specific epithet prigoginei is in honour of Alexandre Prigogine, a Russian-Belgian ornithologist. Alternate names for Prigogine's greenbul include the Butembo greenbul, Congo greenbul and Prigogine's bulbul. It is monotypic.

== Conservation ==
The species is listed as Data Deficient by the IUCN.
