= Ilya Prigogine =

Belgian physical chemist (1917–2003)

- Илья Пригожин
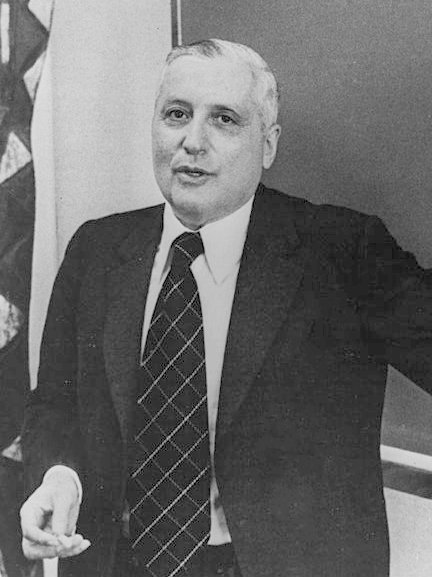
- Prigogine in 1977
- Born: Ilya Ruvimovich Prigogine; 25 January 1917; Moscow, Russia
- Died: 28 May 2003 (aged 86); Brussels, Belgium
- Citizenship: Belgian (1949–2003)
- Education: Free University of Brussels
- Known for: Dissipative structures Brusselator; Non-equilibrium thermodynamics
- Spouses: Hélène Jofé (m. 1945, divorced); Maria Prokopowicz (m. 1961)
- Children: 2
- Relatives: Alexandre Prigogine (brother)
- Awards: Francqui Prize (1955); Cothenius Medal (1975); Rumford Medal (1976); Nobel Prize in Chemistry (1977)
- Scientific career
- Fields: Chemistry; Physics
- Workplaces: Free University of Brussels, Université libre de Bruxelles; International Solvay Institute; University of Texas, Austin; University of Chicago
- Doctoral advisor: Théophile de Donder
- Doctoral students: Radu Bălescu; Adi Bulsara; Paul Clavin; Harry Friedmann; Linda Reichl; Isabelle Stengers

Viscount Ilya Romanovich Prigogine (/prɪˈɡoʊʒiːn/; Russian: Илья Романович Пригожин; 25 January [O.S. 12 January] 1917 – 28 May 2003) was a Belgian physical chemist of Russian origin, noted for his work on dissipative structures, complex systems, and irreversibility.

Prigogine's work most notably earned him the 1977 Nobel Prize in Chemistry “for his contributions to non-equilibrium thermodynamics, particularly the theory of dissipative structures”, as well as the Francqui Prize in 1955, and the Rumford Medal in 1976.

== Biography ==
=== Early life and studies ===
Prigogine was born in Moscow a few months before the October Revolution of 1917, into a Jewish family. His father, Ruvim Abramovich Prigogine (1884–1974), was a chemist who studied at the Imperial Moscow Technical School and owned a paint factory; his mother, Yulia Leivikovna Vikhman (1892–?), was a pianist who attended the Moscow Conservatory. In 1921, the factory having been nationalized by the new Soviet regime and the feeling of insecurity rising amidst the civil war, the family left Russia. After a brief period in Lithuania, they went to Germany and settled in Berlin; 8 years later, the poor economic situation and the creeping emergence of Nazism caused them to move on to Brussels, where Prigogine received Belgian nationality in 1949. His brother Alexandre (1913–1991) became an ornithologist.

As a teenager, Prigogine was interested in music, history and archeology. He graduated from the Athenée d'Ixelles in 1935, majoring in Greek and Latin. His parents encouraged him to become a lawyer, and he initially enrolled in law studies at the Free University of Brussels. At that time he developed an interest in psychology and the study of behavior; in turn, reading about these subjects triggered an interest in chemistry, as chemical processes impact the mind and body; this also triggered a more fundamental interest in physics, as they explain chemistry. He ended up dropping out from the law faculty.

Prigogine afterwards simultaneously enrolled in chemistry and physics at the Free University of Brussels, something he achieved with "uncommon success"; he earned the equivalent of a Master's degree in both disciplines in 1939, and a PhD in chemistry in 1941 under Théophile De Donder.

=== Early career, World War II ===
He started his research career under the German occupation of Belgium. From 1940 onwards he gave clandestine lectures to students. In 1941, the university formally closed to protest the forced appointment of pro-Nazi New Order professors by the occupiers; he continued giving clandestine lectures until the Liberation of Belgium in 1944. During that time window he also published 21 articles. In 1943, Prigogine and his future wife Hélène Jofé were arrested by the Germans; after multiple interventions including by the Queen Elisabeth, they were eventually released a couple of weeks later.

=== Later career ===
In 1951, he became a full professor at his alma mater; at 34 years old, he was the youngest ever full professor at the science faculty in Brussels. In 1959, he was appointed director of the International Solvay Institute in Brussels, Belgium. In that year, he also started teaching at the University of Texas at Austin in the United States, where he later was appointed Regental Professor and Ashbel Smith Professor of Physics and Chemical Engineering. From 1961 until 1966 he was affiliated with the Enrico Fermi Institute at the University of Chicago and was a visiting professor at Northwestern University. In Austin, in 1967, he co-founded the Center for Thermodynamics and Statistical Mechanics, now the Center for Complex Quantum Systems. In that year, he also returned to Belgium, where he became director of the Center for Statistical Mechanics and Thermodynamics.

He was a member of numerous scientific organizations, and received numerous awards, prizes and 53 honorary degrees. In 1955, Prigogine was awarded the Francqui Prize for Exact Sciences. For his study in irreversible thermodynamics, he received the Rumford Medal in 1976, and in 1977, the Nobel Prize in Chemistry "for his contributions to non-equilibrium thermodynamics, particularly the theory of dissipative structures". In 1989, he was awarded the title of viscount in the Belgian nobility by the King of the Belgians. Until his death, he was president of the International Academy of Science, Munich and was in 1997, one of the founders of the International Commission on Distance Education (CODE), a worldwide accreditation agency. Prigogine received an Honorary Doctorate from Heriot-Watt University in 1985 and in 1998 he was awarded an honoris causa doctorate by the UNAM in Mexico City.

Prigogine was first married to Belgian poet Hélène Jofé (as an author also known as Hélène Prigogine) and in 1945 they had a son Yves. After their divorce, he married Polish-born chemist Maria Prokopowicz (also known as Maria Prigogine) in 1961. In 1970 they had a son, Pascal.

In 2003 he was one of 22 Nobel Laureates who signed the Humanist Manifesto.

== Research ==
Prigogine defined dissipative structures and their role in thermodynamic systems far from equilibrium, a discovery that won him the Nobel Prize in Chemistry in 1977. In summary, Ilya Prigogine discovered that importation and dissipation of energy into chemical systems could result in the emergence of new structures (hence dissipative structures) due to internal self reorganization. In his 1955 text, Prigogine drew connections between dissipative structures and the Rayleigh-Bénard instability and the Turing mechanism. And his 1977 work on self-reorganization was recognized as relevant for psychology.

=== Dissipative structures theory ===
Dissipative structure theory led to pioneering research in self-organizing systems, as well as philosophical inquiries into the formation of complexity in biological entities and the quest for a creative and irreversible role of time in the natural sciences.

With professor Robert Herman, he also developed the basis of the two fluid model, a traffic model in traffic engineering for urban networks, analogous to the two fluid model in classical statistical mechanics, a common problem that had attracted Prigogine's attention some years before.

Prigogine's formal concept of self-organization was used also as a "complementary bridge" between general systems theory and thermodynamics, conciliating the cloudiness of some important systems theory concepts such as entropy instead of molecular disorder, and emergence, fluctuations and irreversibility instead of “birth and death” with scientific rigor.

=== Work on unsolved problems in physics ===
In his later years, his work concentrated on the fundamental role of indeterminism in nonlinear systems on both the classical and quantum level. Prigogine and coworkers proposed a Liouville space extension of quantum mechanics.A Liouville space is the vector space formed by the set of (self-adjoint) linear operators, equipped with an inner product, that act on a Hilbert space. There exists a mapping of each linear operator into Liouville space, yet not every self-adjoint operator of Liouville space has a counterpart in Hilbert space, and in this sense Liouville space has a richer structure than Hilbert space. The Liouville space extension proposal by Prigogine and co-workers aimed to solve the arrow of time problem of thermodynamics and the measurement problem of quantum mechanics.

Prigogine co-authored several books with Isabelle Stengers, including The End of Certainty and La Nouvelle Alliance (Order Out of Chaos: Man's New Dialogue with Nature).

=== The End of Certainty ===
In his 1996 book, La Fin des certitudes, written in collaboration with Isabelle Stengers and published in English in 1997 as The End of Certainty: Time, Chaos, and the New Laws of Nature, Prigogine contends that determinism is no longer a viable scientific belief: "The more we know about our universe, the more difficult it becomes to believe in determinism." This is a major departure from the approach of Newton, Einstein and Schrödinger, all of whom expressed their theories in terms of deterministic equations. According to Prigogine, determinism loses its explanatory power in the face of irreversibility and instability.

Prigogine traces the dispute over determinism back to Darwin, whose attempt to explain individual variability according to evolving populations inspired Ludwig Boltzmann to explain the behavior of gases in terms of populations of particles rather than individual particles. This led to the field of statistical mechanics and the realization that gases undergo irreversible processes. In deterministic physics, all processes are time-reversible, meaning that they can proceed backward as well as forward through time. As Prigogine explains, determinism is fundamentally a denial of the arrow of time. With no arrow of time, there is no longer a privileged moment known as the "present," which follows a determined "past" and precedes an undetermined "future." All of time is simply given, with the future as determined or as undetermined as the past. With irreversibility, the arrow of time is reintroduced to physics. Prigogine notes numerous examples of irreversibility, including diffusion, radioactive decay, solar radiation, weather and the emergence and evolution of life. Like weather systems, organisms are unstable systems existing far from thermodynamic equilibrium. Instability resists standard deterministic explanation. Instead, due to sensitivity to initial conditions, unstable systems can only be explained statistically, that is, in terms of probability.

Prigogine asserts that Newtonian physics has now been "extended" three times: first with the introduction of spacetime in general relativity, then with the use of the wave function in quantum mechanics, and finally with the recognition of indeterminism in the study of unstable systems (chaos theory).

== Publications ==
- Prigogine, I.; Defay, R. (1954). Chemical Thermodynamics. London: Longmans Green and Co.
- Prigogine, I. (1955). Introduction to Thermodynamics of Irreversible Processes. Springfield, Illinois: Charles C. Thomas Publisher.
- Prigogine, Ilya (1957). The Molecular Theory of Solutions. Amsterdam: North Holland Publishing Company.
- Prigogine, Ilya (1961). Introduction to Thermodynamics of Irreversible Processes (Second ed.). New York: Interscience. OCLC 219682909.
- Prigogine, Ilya (1962). Non-equilibrium statistical mechanics. Monographs in Statistical Physics and Thermodynamics, Vol. I. Interscience Publishers. 2017 reprint. Courier Dover Publications. 27 February 2017. ISBN 978-0-486-82040-8.
- Defay, R. & Prigogine, I. (1966). Surface tension and adsorption. Longmans, Green & Co. LTD.
- Glansdorff, Paul; Prigogine, I. (1971). Thermodynamics Theory of Structure, Stability and Fluctuations. London: Wiley-Interscience.
- Prigogine, Ilya; Herman, R. (1971). Kinetic Theory of Vehicular Traffic. New York: American Elsevier. ISBN 0-444-00082-8.
- Prigogine, Ilya; Nicolis, G. (1977). Self-Organization in Non-Equilibrium Systems. Wiley. ISBN 0-471-02401-5.
- Prigogine, Ilya (1980). From Being To Becoming. Freeman. ISBN 0-7167-1107-9.
- Prigogine, Ilya; Stengers, Isabelle (1984). Order out of Chaos: Man's new dialogue with nature. Flamingo. ISBN 0-00-654115-1. 2018 edition. Verso Books. 23 January 2018. ISBN 978-1-78663-100-8.
- Prigogine, I. The Behavior of Matter under Nonequilibrium Conditions: Fundamental Aspects and Applications in Energy-oriented Problems, United States Department of Energy, Progress Reports:
  - September 1984 – November 1987, (7 October 1987). Department of Physics at the University of Texas-Austin
  - 15 April 1988 – 14 April 1989, (January 1989), Center for Studies in Statistical Mathematics at the University of Texas-Austin.
  - 15 April 1990 – 14 April 1991, (December 1990), Center for Studies in Statistical Mechanics and Complex Systems at the University of Texas-Austin.
- Nicolis, G.; Prigogine, I. (1989). Exploring complexity: An introduction. New York, NY: W. H. Freeman. ISBN 0-7167-1859-6.
- Prigogine, I. "Time, Dynamics and Chaos: Integrating Poincare's 'Non-Integrable Systems'", Center for Studies in Statistical Mechanics and Complex Systems at the University of Texas-Austin, United States Department of Energy-Office of Energy Research, Commission of the European Communities (October 1990).
- Prigogine, Ilya (1993). Chaotic Dynamics and Transport in Fluids and Plasmas: Research Trends in Physics Series. New York: American Institute of Physics. ISBN 0-88318-923-2.
- Petrosky, T. & Prigogine, I. (1997). The Liouville space extension of quantum mechanics. In: Advances in Chemical Physics, 99, 1-120.
- Prigogine, Ilya; Stengers, Isabelle (1997). The End of Certainty. The Free Press. ISBN 978-0-684-83705-5.
- Kondepudi, Dilip; Prigogine, Ilya (1998). Modern Thermodynamics: From Heat Engines to Dissipative Structures. Wiley. ISBN 978-0-471-97394-2. Kondepudi, Dilip; Prigogine, Ilya (31 December 2014). 2014 edition. John Wiley & Sons. ISBN 978-1-118-37181-7.
- Prigogine, Ilya (2002). Advances in Chemical Physics. New York: Wiley InterScience. ISBN 978-0-471-26431-6.
- Editor (with Stuart A. Rice) of the Advances in Chemical Physics book series published by John Wiley & Sons (presently over 140 volumes)
- Prigogine I, (papers and interviews) Is future given?, World Scientific, 2003. ISBN 9789812385086 (145p.)

== Ilya Prigogine Prize for Thermodynamics ==
The Ilya Prigogine Prize for Thermodynamics was initialized in 2001 and patronized by Ilya Prigogine himself until his death in 2003. It is awarded on a biennial basis during the Joint European Thermodynamics Conference (JETC) and considers all branches of thermodynamics (applied, theoretical, and experimental as well as quantum thermodynamics and classical thermodynamics).

== See also ==
- Autocatalytic reactions and order creation
- List of Jewish Nobel laureates
- Schismatrix
- Systems theory
- Prigogine's theorem
- Process philosophy
