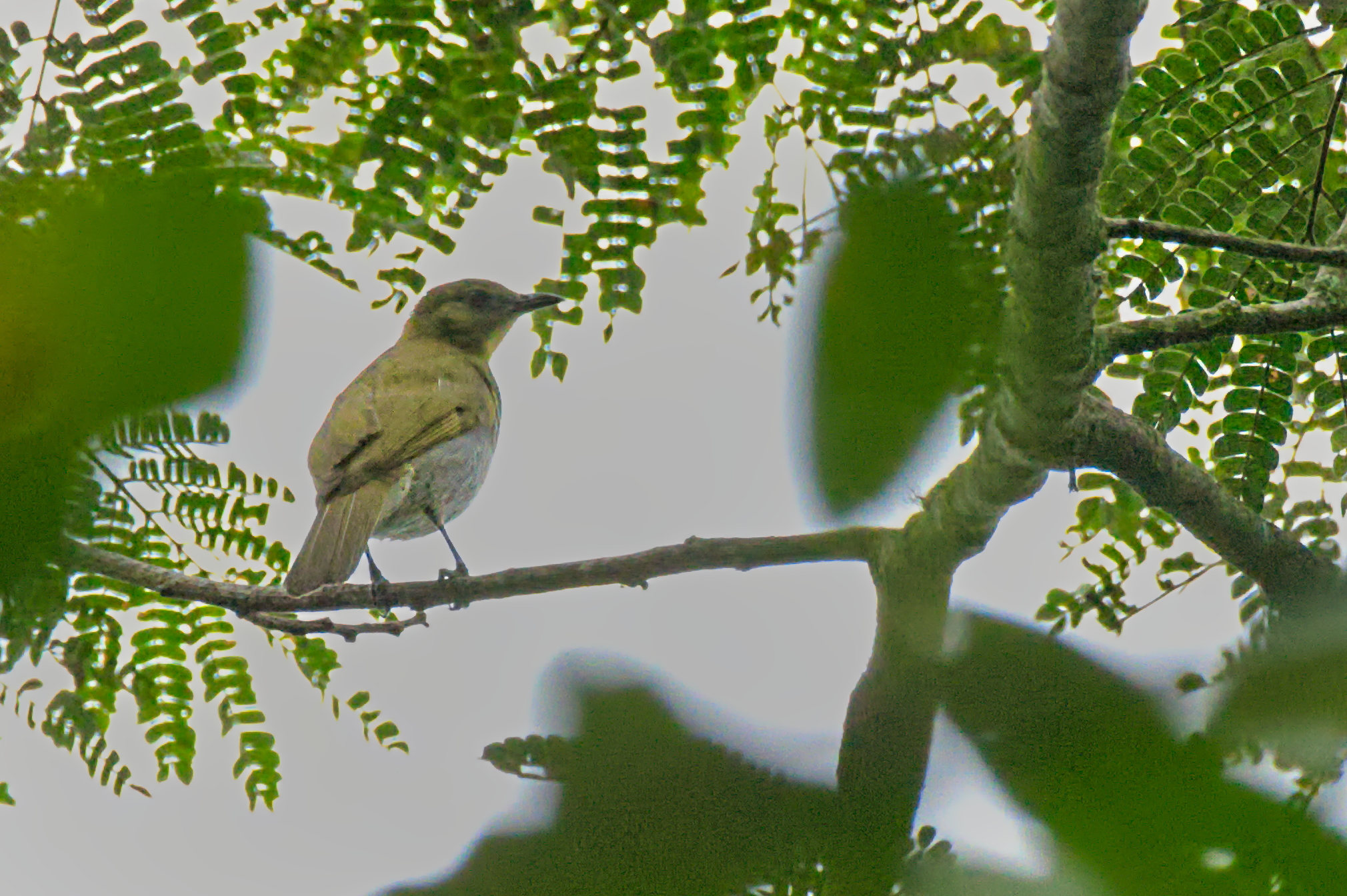

Conservation status
- Least Concern (IUCN 3.1)

Scientific classification
- Kingdom: Animalia
- Phylum: Chordata
- Class: Aves
- Order: Passeriformes
- Family: Pycnonotidae
- Genus: Chlorocichla
- Species: C. falkensteini

Binomial name
- Chlorocichla falkensteini (Reichenow, 1874)
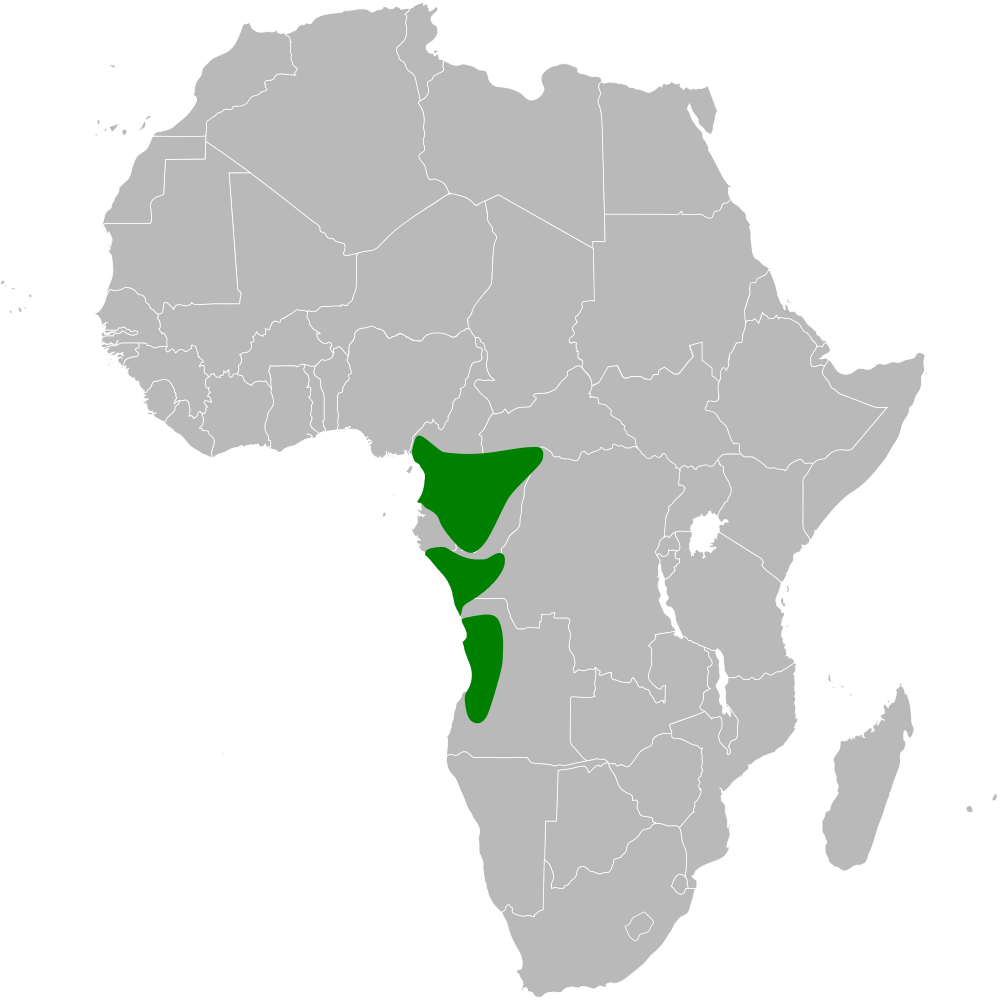

Synonyms
- Andropadus falkensteini; Criniger Falkensteini

= Falkenstein's greenbul =

Species of songbird

Falkenstein's greenbul (Chlorocichla falkensteini) is a species of songbird in the bulbul family, Pycnonotidae. It is found from western Cameroon and Central African Republic to central Angola. Its natural habitats are subtropical or tropical moist lowland forests, moist savanna, and subtropical or tropical moist shrubland.

== Taxonomy and systematics ==
Falkenstein's greenbul was originally described in the genus Criniger and later in Andropadus before being re-classified to Chlorocichla. Alternate names for the yellow-bellied greenbul include the yellow-necked greenbul, yellow-necked bulbul, yellow-throated bulbul and yellow-throated greenbul. The latter two names should not be confused with the species of the same names, Pycnonotus xantholaemus and Arizelocichla chlorigula respectively. The alternate name 'yellow-necked greenbul' is also used as an alternate name by the yellow-bellied greenbul.
