= Prigogine's theorem =

Theorem of thermodynamics of non-equilibrium processes

Prigogine's theorem is a theorem of non-equilibrium thermodynamics, originally formulated by Ilya Prigogine.

The formulation of Prigogine's theorem is:

In a stationary state, the production of entropy inside a thermodynamic system with constant external parameters is minimal and constant. If the system is not in a stationary state, then it will change until the entropy production rate, or, in other words, the dissipative function of the system, takes the smallest value.

According to this theorem, the stationary state of a linear non-equilibrium system (under conditions that prevent the achievement of an equilibrium state) corresponds to the minimum entropy production. If there are no such obstacles, then the production of entropy reaches its absolute minimum - zero. A linear system means the fulfillment of linear phenomenological relationships between thermodynamic flows and driving forces. The coefficients of proportionality in the relationships between flows and driving forces are called phenomenological coefficients.

The theorem was proved by Prigogine in 1947 from the Onsager relations. Prigogine's theorem is valid if the kinetic coefficients in the Onsager relations are constant (do not depend on driving forces and flows); for real systems, it is valid only approximately, so the minimum entropy production for a stationary state is not such a general principle as the maximum entropy for an equilibrium state. It has been experimentally established that Onsager's linear relations are valid in a fairly wide range of parameters for heat conduction and diffusion processes (for example, Fourier's law, Fick's law). For chemical reactions, the linear assumption is valid in a narrow region near the state of chemical equilibrium. The principle is also violated for systems odd with respect to time reversal.
