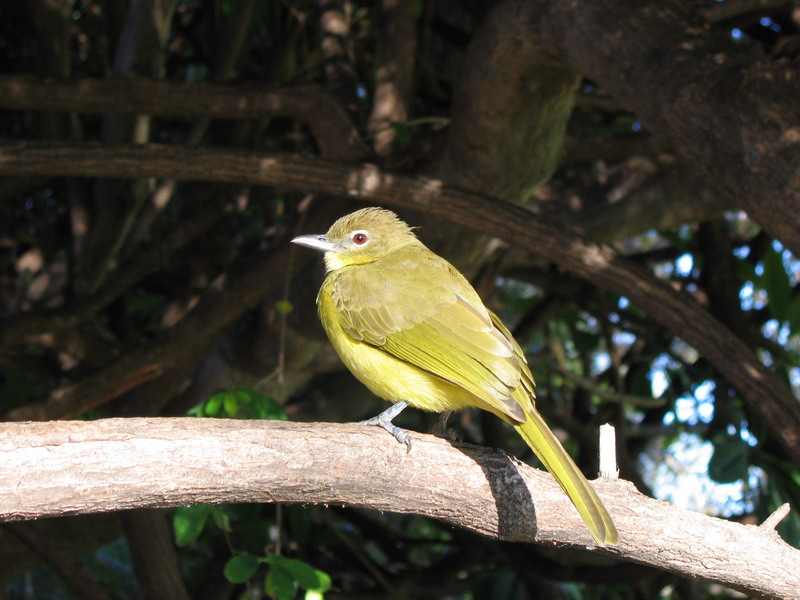
- Yellow-bellied greenbul (Chlorocichla flaviventris)

Scientific classification
- Kingdom: Animalia
- Phylum: Chordata
- Class: Aves
- Order: Passeriformes
- Family: Pycnonotidae
- Genus: Chlorocichla; Sharpe, 1882

Type species
- Trichophorus flaviventris (Yellow-bellied greenbul) Smith, A, 1834
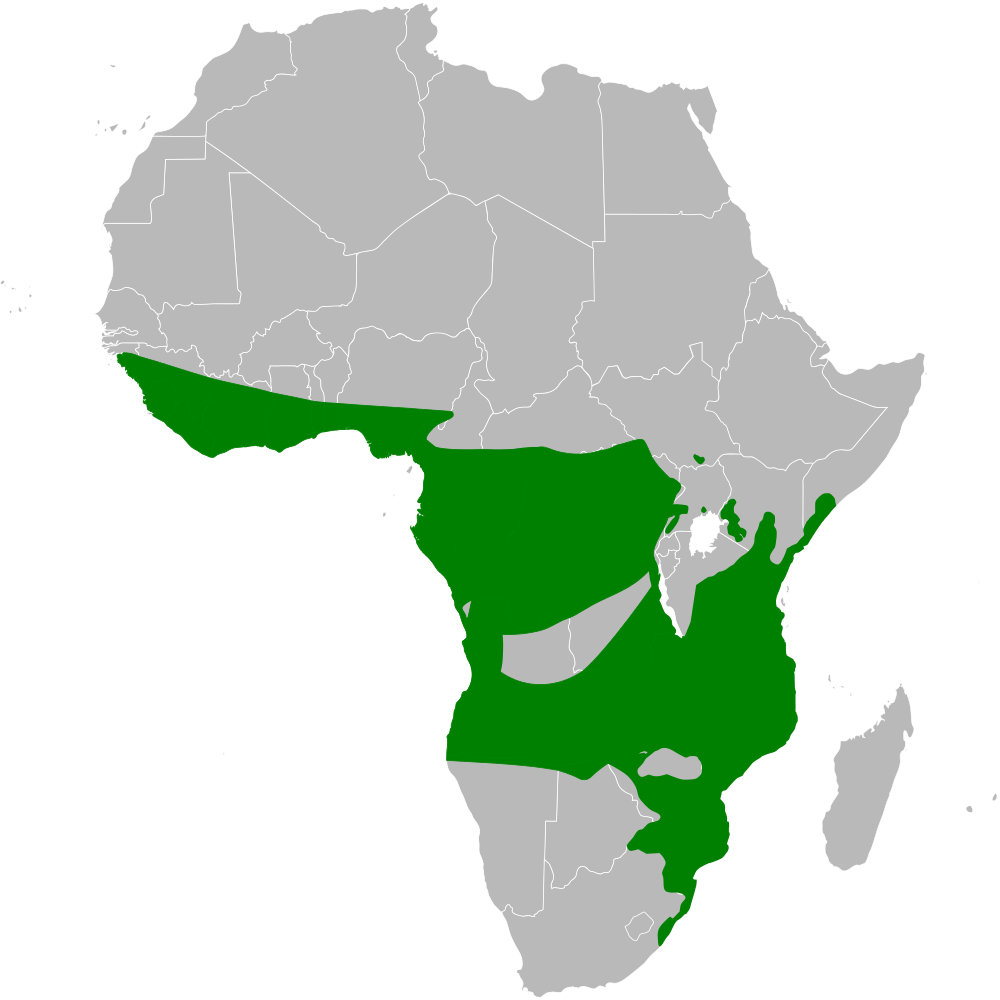

= Chlorocichla =

Genus of birds

Chlorocichla is a genus of songbird in the bulbul family, Pycnonotidae. They are mainly present throughout the African tropical rainforest, excepted the yellow-bellied greenbul, native to the miombo woodlands.

== Taxonomy ==
The genus Chlorocichla was introduced in 1882 by the English ornithologist Richard Bowdler Sharpe. Sharpe did not specify a type species but this was designated as the yellow-bellied greenbul by Anton Reichenow in 1904–1905. The genus name combines the Ancient Greek khlōros meaning "pale green" or "yellow" with kikhlē meaning "thrush".

=== Species ===
The genus contains the following five species:

Image	Common name	Scientific name	Distribution
	Joyful greenbul	Chlorocichla laetissima	East-central Africa.
	Prigogine's greenbul	Chlorocichla prigoginei	Found only in eastern Democratic Republic of the Congo.
	Falkenstein's greenbul	Chlorocichla falkensteini	Western Cameroon and Central African Republic to central Angola.
	Yellow-bellied greenbul	Chlorocichla flaviventris	Eastern, southern and west-central Africa.
	Simple greenbul	Chlorocichla simplex	Widespread throughout the African tropical rainforest.

=== Former species ===
Formerly, some authorities also considered the following species (or subspecies) as species within the genus Chlorocichla:

- Honeyguide greenbul (as Chlorocichla indicator, now Baeopogon indicator)
- Yellow-throated leaflove (as Chlorocichla flavicollis, now Atimastillas flavicollis)
