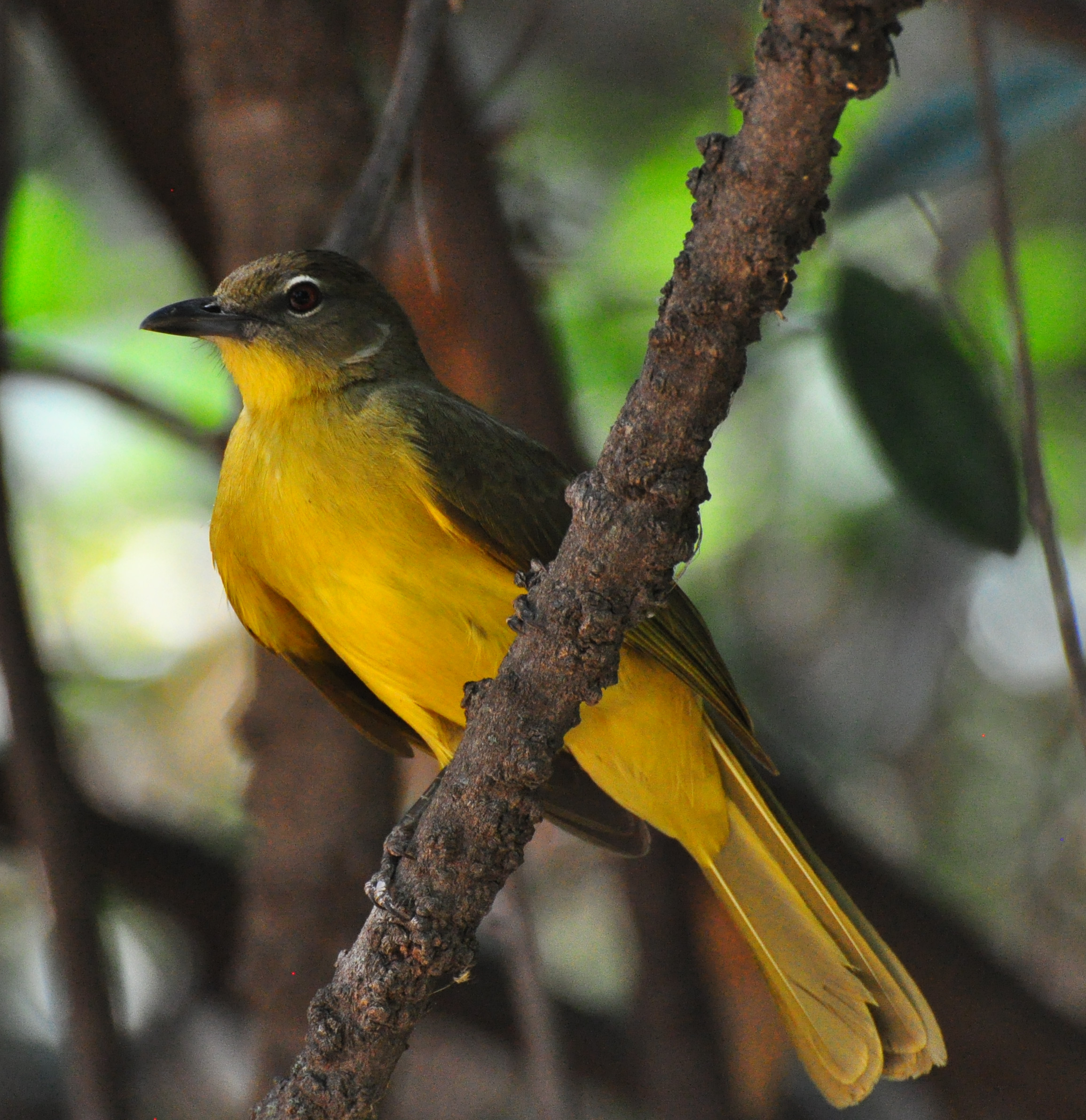
- Chlorocichla flaviventris occidentalis, Popa Falls, Namibia

Conservation status
- Least Concern (IUCN 3.1)

Scientific classification
- Kingdom: Animalia
- Phylum: Chordata
- Class: Aves
- Order: Passeriformes
- Family: Pycnonotidae
- Genus: Chlorocichla
- Species: C. flaviventris

Binomial name
- Chlorocichla flaviventris (Smith, A, 1834)
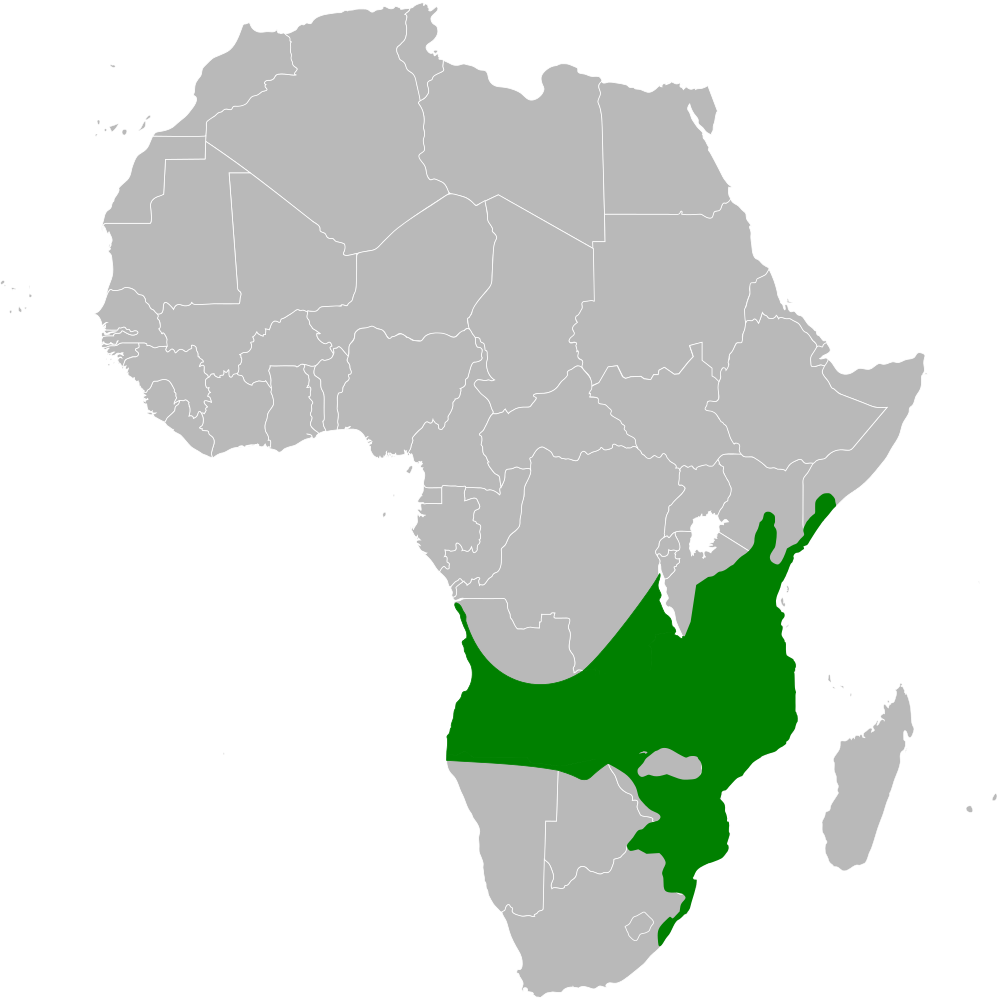

Synonyms
- Trichophorus flaviventris

= Yellow-bellied greenbul =

- Chlorocichla flaviventris flaviventris, Kwa-Zulu Natal

Species of songbird

The yellow-bellied greenbul (Chlorocichla flaviventris) is a species of songbird in the bulbul family, Pycnonotidae. It is found in eastern, southern and west-central Africa. Its natural habitats are subtropical or tropical dry forests, subtropical or tropical moist lowland forests, and dry savanna.

== Taxonomy and systematics ==
The yellow-bellied greenbul was originally described in the genus Trichophorus (a synonym for Criniger) and then re-classified within Chlorocichla. Alternate names for the yellow-bellied greenbul include the African yellow-bellied bulbul, yellow-bellied bulbul, yellow-breasted bulbul, yellow-breasted greenbul and yellow-necked greenbul. The latter name is also used as an alternate name by Falkenstein's greenbul. The name 'yellow-bellied bulbul' should not be confused with the species of the same name, Alophoixus phaeocephalus.

=== Subspecies ===
Three subspecies of the yellow-bellied greenbul are recognized:

- Kenya yellow-bellied greenbul (Chlorocichla flaviventris centralis) - Reichenow, 1887: Originally described as a separate species - also named the Muanza yellow-throated greenbul, found from southern Somalia to northern Mozambique
- Zambezi yellow-bellied greenbul (Chlorocichla flaviventris occidentalis) - Sharpe, 1882: Originally described as a separate species, found from north-western Angola to western Tanzania and south to north-western Namibia, northern Botswana, northern South Africa and central Mozambique
- Chlorocichla flaviventris flaviventris - (Smith, A, 1834): Found in eastern South Africa and southern Mozambique
