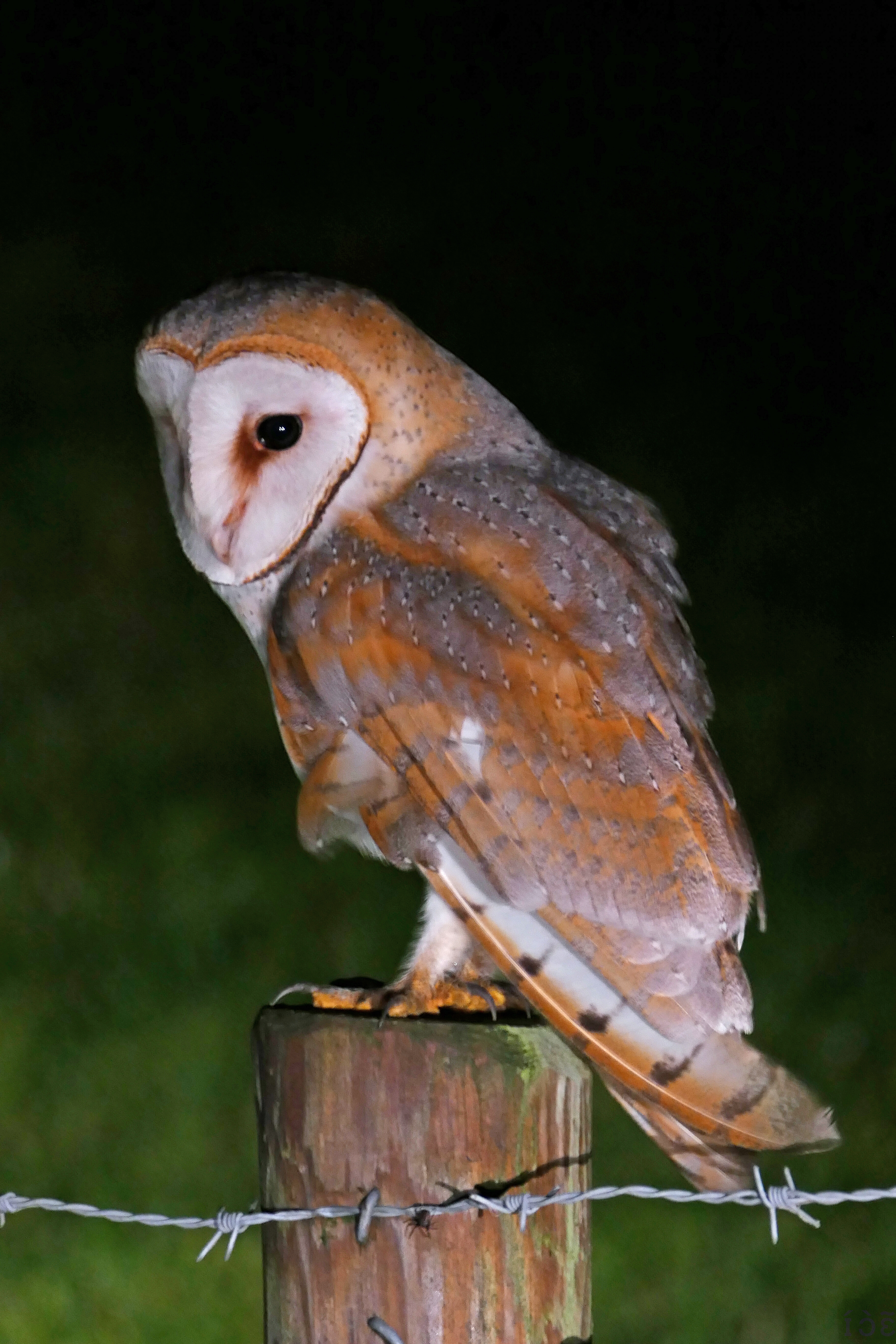
- Western barn owl (Tyto alba)

Scientific classification
- Kingdom: Animalia
- Phylum: Chordata
- Class: Aves
- Order: Strigiformes
- Family: Tytonidae; Ridgway, 1914

Genera
- Tyto; Phodilus; For fossil genera, see article.

Synonyms
- Tytoninae sensu Sibley & Ahlquist

= Tytonidae =

Tytonidae Temporal range: Late Eocene to present

Family of birds

The bird family Tytonidae, which includes the barn owls Tyto and the bay owls Phodilus, is one of the two families of owls, the other being the true owls or typical owls, Strigidae. Tytonidae are medium to large owls with large heads and characteristic heart-shaped faces. They have long, strong legs with powerful talons. Tytonidae also differ from the Strigidae in structural details relating in particular to the sternum and feet.

The family is wide-ranging, although they are not very tolerant of severe winter cold, so are absent from northern areas of Europe, Asia, and North America; they are also absent from driest desert regions. They live in a wide range of habitats from semi-deserts to forests, and from temperate latitudes to the tropics. Within these habitats, they live near agricultural areas with high amounts of human activity. The majority of the 20 living species of barn owls are poorly known. Some, like the red owl, have barely been seen or studied since their discovery, in contrast to the western barn owl Tyto alba, which is one of the best-known owl species in the world. However, some subspecies of the western barn owl possibly deserve to be separate species, but are very poorly known.

Five species of barn owl are threatened, and some island species went extinct during the Holocene or earlier (e.g., Tyto pollens, known from the fossil record of Andros Island in the Bahamas, and possibly the basis for the mythical chickcharney). Barn owls are mostly nocturnal and generally non-migratory, living in pairs or singly.

== Taxonomy and systematics ==
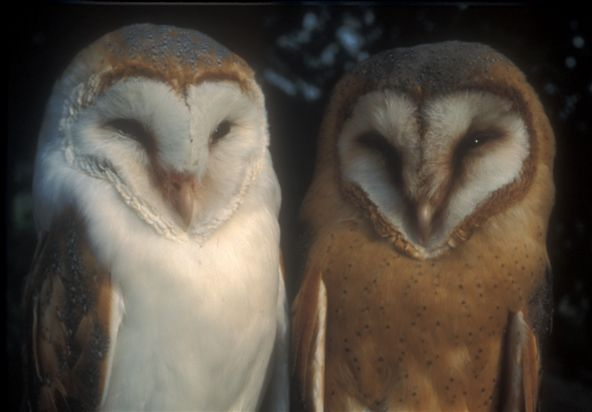
Male Tyto alba alba (left) and female T. a. guttata barn owls in the Netherlands, where these subspecies intergrade

Barn owls consist of two extant subfamilies: the Tytoninae or Tyto owls (including the western barn owl) and the Phodilinae or bay owls. The modern genera Tyto and Phodilus are thought to have originated from a common ancestor from the Oligocene period. Phylogeny research dates it at about 32.9 million years ago and suggests that the last common ancestor of the living Tyto species could have ranged across Africa, Eurasia and Oceania. The research further suggests that barn owls of the Americas have descent from a single Eurasian lineage that colonized the Greater Antilles and then spread across the Caribbean and from there to the mainland.

The systematics of this group began with the discovery of Tyto ostologa (now extinct), whose remains were found in north-central Haiti. This discovery led to the finding of Tyto pollens, Tyto noeli, and Tyto riveroi in nearby cave deposits, all of which are now extinct and were also considered giant. The Sibley-Ahlquist taxonomy unites the Caprimulgiformes with the owl order; here, barn owls are a subfamily, Tytoninae. This is unsupported by more recent research (see Cypselomorphae), but the relationships of the owls in general are still unresolved.

The ashy-faced owl (T. glaucops) was for some time included in T. alba. Based on DNA evidence, König, Weick & Becking (2009) recognised the American barn owl (Tyto furcata) and the Curaçao barn owl (T. bargei) as separate species. They proposed that T. a. delicatula should be split off as a separate species, to be known as the eastern barn owl, which would include the subspecies T. d. delicatula, T. d. sumbaensis, T. d. meeki, T. d. crassirostris, and T. d. interposita. As of 2021, the International Ornithological Committee had not accepted the split of Tyto delicatula from T. javanica.

Some island subspecies are occasionally treated as distinct species, a move which should await further research into barn owl phylogeography. According to Murray Bruce in Handbook of Birds of the World Volume 5: Barn-owls to Hummingbirds, "a review of the whole group [is] long overdue". Molecular analysis of mitochondrial DNA shows a separation of the species into two clades, an Old World alba and a New World furcata, but this study did not include T. a. delicatula, which the authors seem to have accepted as a separate species. Extensive genetic variation was found between the Indonesian T. a. stertens and other members of the alba clade, leading to the separation of stertens into Tyto javanica.

Twenty to thirty subspecies are usually recognized, varying mainly in body proportions, size, and colour. Barn owls range in colour from the almost beige-and-white nominate subspecies alba, erlangeri, and niveicauda, to the nearly black-and-brown contempta. Island forms are mostly smaller than mainland ones, and those inhabiting forests have darker plumage and shorter wings than those living in open grasslands. Several subspecies are generally considered to be intergrades between more distinct populations.

=== Extant genera ===
Two extant genera are accepted:

- Genus Tyto – barn owls, grass owls and masked owls (18 species)
- Genus Phodilus – bay owls (2 species)

==== Genus Tyto ====
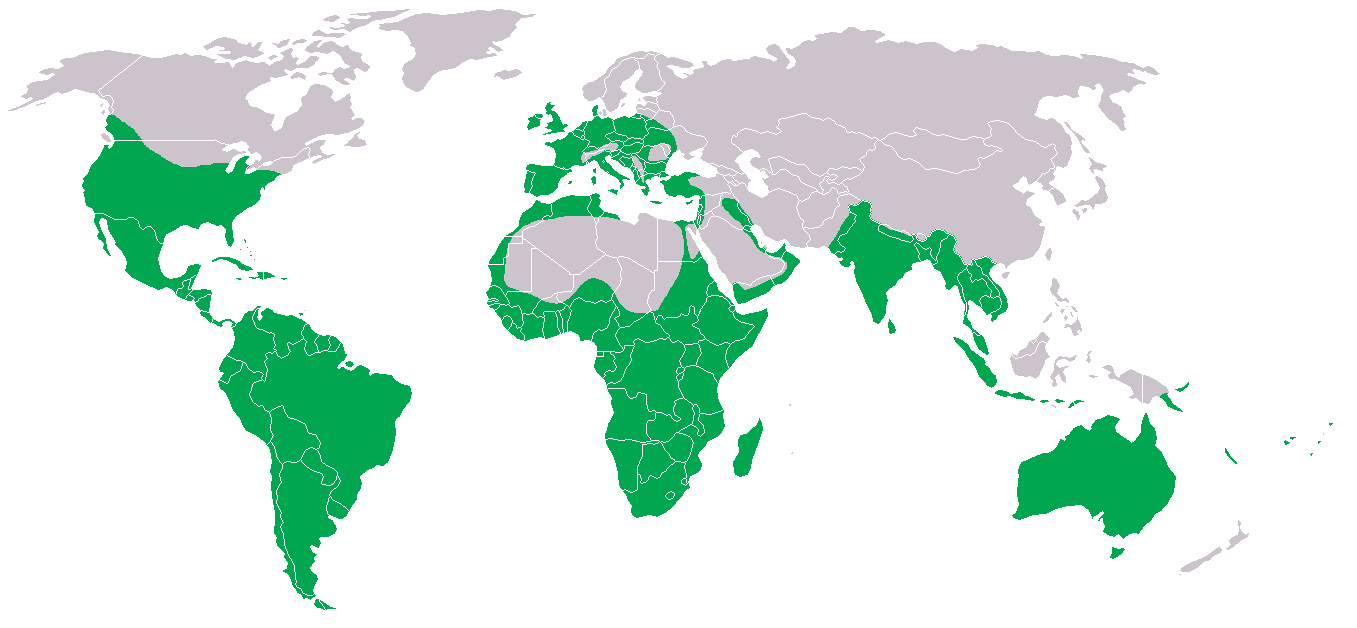
This map shows the combined distributions of the genus Tyto.

Some of the Tyto species that exist include the western barn owl (Tyto alba), the American barn owl (Tyto furctata), and the eastern barn owl (T. javanica, including the Australian barn owl T. javanica delicatula). Within each of these species, there are many subspecies. Of the western barn owl there are 10 subspecies: T. a. alba, T. a. detorta, T. a. erlangeri, T. a. ernesti, T. a. gracilirostris, T. a. guttata, T. a. hypermetra, T. a. poensis, T. a. schmitzi, T. a. thomensis. Of the American barn owl, there are 10 subspecies: T. f. bargei, T. f. bondi, T. f. contempta, T. f. furcata, T. f. guatemalae, T. f. hellmayri, T. f. niveicauda, T. f. pratincola, T. f. punctatissima, T. f. tuidara. Of the Australian barn owl, there are 7 subspecies: T. j. crassirostris, T. j. delicatula, T. j. javanica, T. j. interposita, T. j. meeki, T. j. stertens, T. j. sumbaensis.

The western barn owl (T. alba) can be found in Africa and parts of Asia, including Eurasia. The American barn owl (T. furcata) can be found from North to South America. Lastly, the Australian barn owl (T. delicatula) can be found in Australia, New Zealand, Polynesia, and Asia.

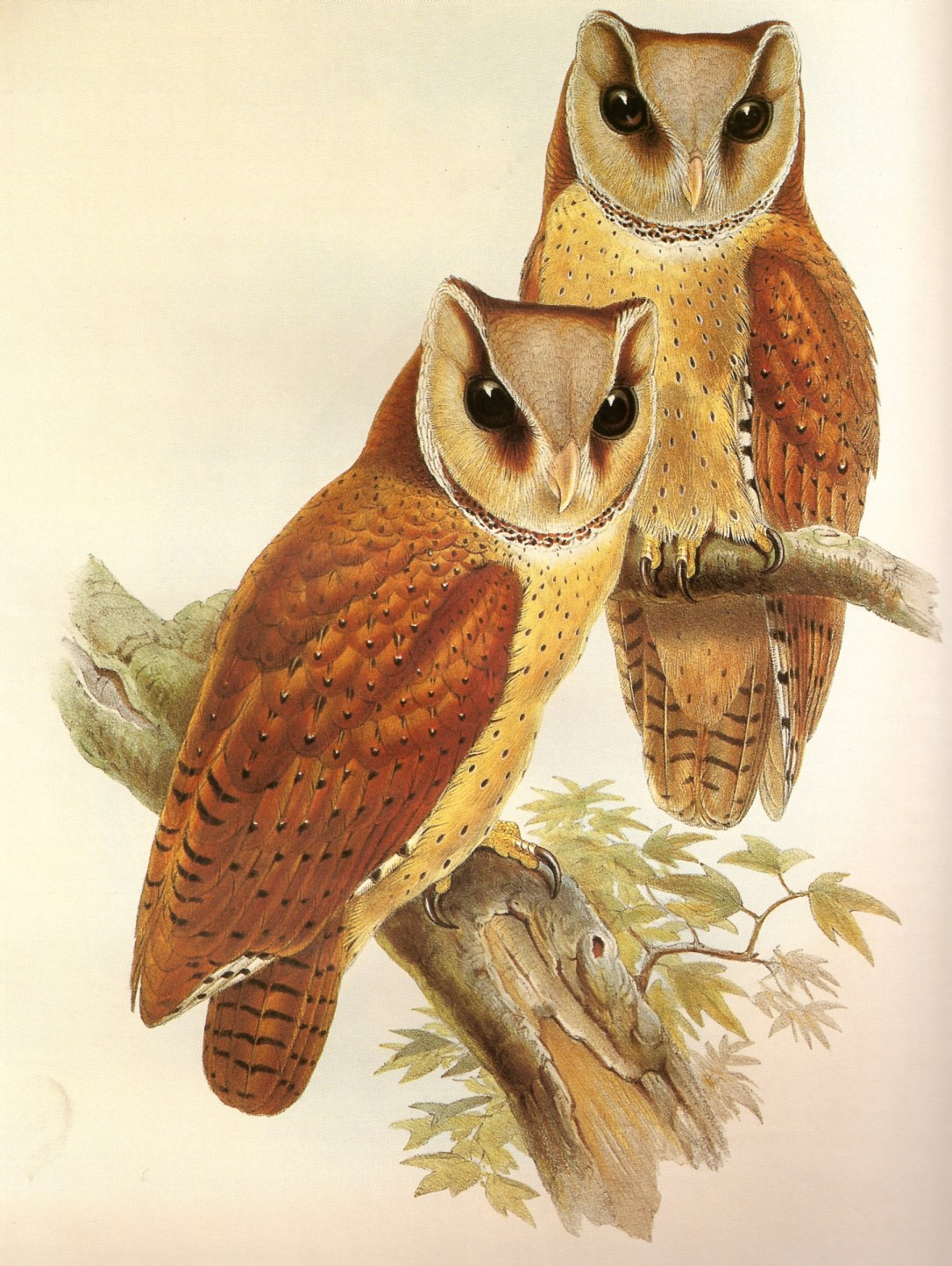
Bay owls, genus Phodilus

==== Genus Phodilus ====
This genus includes the Oriental bay owl (P. badius) and the Sri Lanka bay owl (P. assimilis). The genus has a much smaller distribution than Tyto, with Oriental bay owls found in tropical Asia and Sri Lanka bay owls found in Sri Lanka and southwestern India.

=== Extinct genera ===
The fossil record of barn owls goes back to the Eocene, with the family eventually losing ground to the true owls after the radiation of rodents and owls during the Neogene epoch. Two subfamilies are known only from the fossil record: the Necrobyinae and the Selenornithinae. At least four extinct genera of barn owls have been described:

- Genus Nocturnavis (Late Eocene/Early Oligocene) – includes Bubo incertus
- Genus Necrobyas (Late Eocene/Early Oligocene – Late Miocene, France) – includes Bubo arvernensis and Paratyto
- Genus Selenornis (Late Eocene/Early Oligocene of Quercy, France) – includes Asio henrici
- Genus Prosybris (Late Eocene/Early Oligocene of Quercy(?) – Early Miocene of France and Austria)

=== Placement unresolved ===
- Tytonidae gen. et sp. indet. "TMT 164" (Middle Miocene of Grive-Saint-Alban, France) - Prosybris?
- Genus Palaeotyto (Late Eocene/Early Oligocene) from Quercy, France. Placement in this family is tentative, it may instead belong to the family Sophiornithidae.
- Genus Palaeobyas (Late Eocene/Early Oligocene) from Quercy, France. Placement in this family is tentative, it may instead belong to the family Sophiornithidae.

=== Former genera ===
The supposed "giant barn owl" Basityto from the Early Eocene of Grafenmühle (Germany) was actually a crowned crane (Balearica); the presumed "Easter Island barn owl", based on subfossil bones found on Rapa Nui, has turned out to be a procellarid; and the specimen originally described as the fossilized Pliocene Lechusa stirtoni was later determined to be recent remains of a modern-day American barn owl.

== Description ==
The main characteristic of the barn owls is the heart-shaped facial disc, formed by stiff feathers which serve to amplify and locate the source of sounds when hunting. Further adaptations in the wing feathers eliminate sound caused by flying, aiding both the hearing of the owl listening for hidden prey and keeping the prey unaware of the owl. Barn owls overall are darker on the back than the front, usually an orange-brown colour, the front being a paler version of the back or mottled, although considerable variation is seen even within species.

Bay owls closely resemble the Tyto owls, but have a divided facial disc, ear tufts, and tend to be smaller.

== Distribution ==
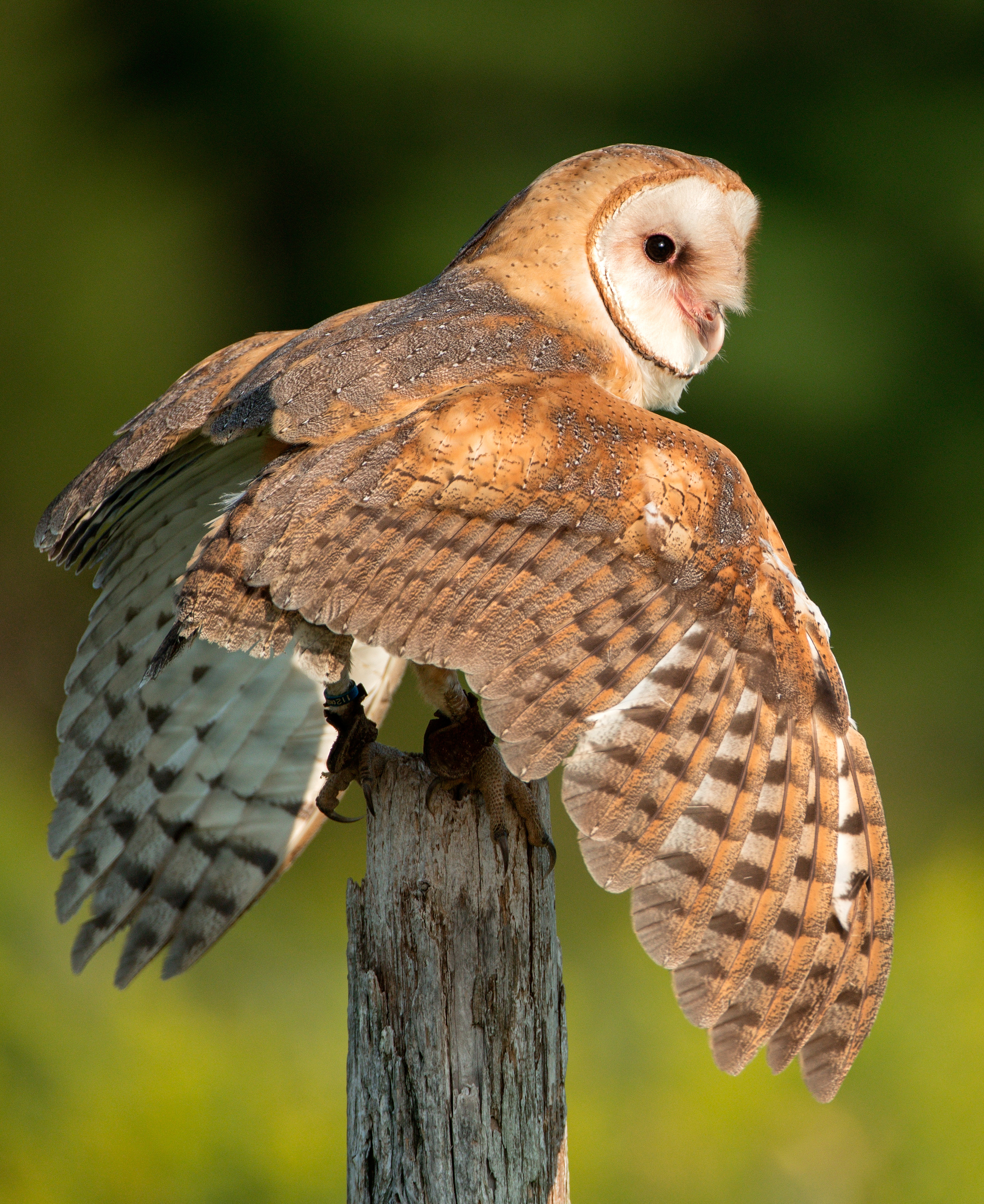
American barn owl, Canada, with detail of wings and tail feathers

The barn owl is the most widespread landbird species in the world, occurring on every continent except Antarctica. Its range includes all of Europe (except Fennoscandia and Malta), most of Africa apart from the Sahara, the Indian subcontinent, Southeast Asia, Australia, many Pacific Islands, and North-, Central-, and South America. In general, it is considered to be sedentary, and, indeed, many individuals, having taken up residence in a particular location, remain there even when better nearby foraging areas are available. In the British Isles, the young seem largely to disperse along river corridors, and the distance travelled from their natal site averages about 9 km (5.6 mi).

In continental Europe, the dispersal distance is greater, commonly somewhere between 50 and 100 kilometres (31 and 62 mi) but exceptionally 1,500 km (932 mi), with ringed birds from the Netherlands ending up in Spain and in Ukraine. In the United States, dispersal is typically over distances of 80 and 320 km (50 and 199 mi), with the most travelled individuals ending up some 1,760 km (1,094 mi) from their points of origin. Dispersal movements in the African continent include 1,000 km (621 mi), from Senegambia to Sierra Leone, and up to 579 km (360 mi) within South Africa. In Australia, there is some migration, as the birds move towards the northern coast in the dry season and southward in the wet season, as well as nomadic movements in association with rodent plagues. Occasionally, some of these birds turn up on Norfolk Island, Lord Howe Island, or New Zealand, showing that crossing the ocean is within their capabilities. In 2008, barn owls were recorded for the first time breeding in New Zealand. The barn owl has been successfully introduced into the Hawaiian island of Kauai in an attempt to control rodents; distressingly, it has been found to also feed on native birds.

== Behaviour and ecology ==
=== Hunting and feeding ===
Hunting in twilight or at night, the barn owl can target its prey and dive to the ground. Its legs and toes are long and slender, which improves its ability to forage among dense foliage or beneath the snow and gives it a wide spread of talons when attacking prey. This bird hunts by flying slowly, quartering the ground and hovering over spots that may conceal prey. It has long, broad wings that enable it to manoeuvre and turn abruptly. It has acute hearing, with ears placed asymmetrically, which improves detection of sound position and distance; the bird does not require sight to hunt. The facial disc helps with the bird's hearing, as is shown by the fact that, with the ruff feathers removed, the bird can still determine a sound source's direction, although without the disc it cannot determine the source's height. It may perch on branches, fence posts, or other lookouts to scan its surroundings, and this is the main means of prey location in the oil palm plantations of Malaysia.

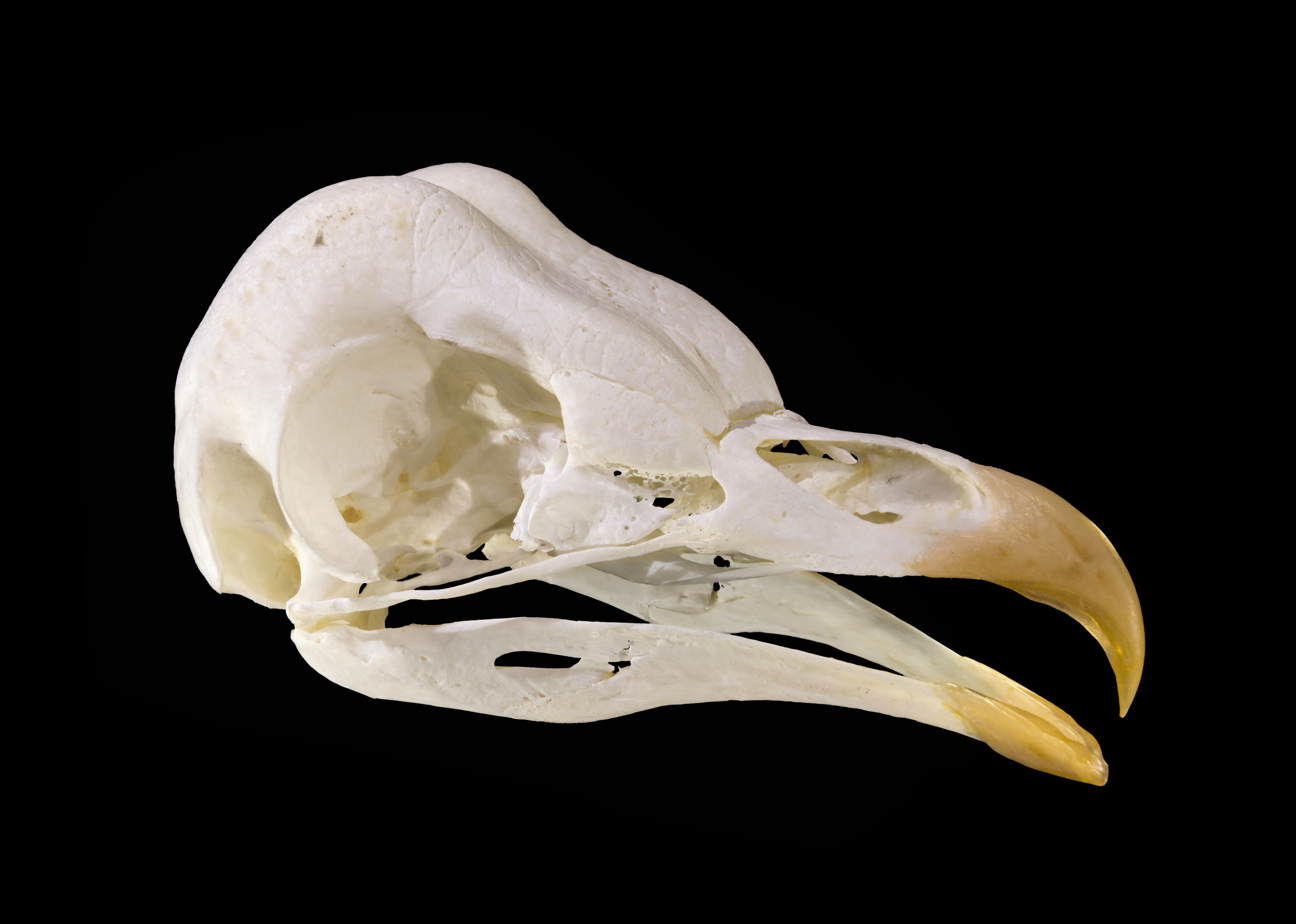
Skull, showing the powerful beak

Rodents and other small mammals may constitute over ninety percent of the prey caught. Birds are also taken, as well as lizards, amphibians, fish, spiders, and insects. Even when they are plentiful, and other prey scarce, earthworms do not seem to be consumed. In North America and most of Europe, voles predominate in the diet, and shrews are the second most common food choice. In Ireland, the accidental introduction of the bank vole in the 1950s led to a major shift in the barn owl's diet: where their ranges overlap, the vole is now by far the largest prey item. Mice and rats are the main foodstuffs in the Mediterranean region, the tropics, subtropics, and Australia. Gophers, muskrats, hares, rabbits, and bats are also preyed upon. Barn owls are usually specialist feeders in productive areas and generalists in areas where prey is scarce.

On the Cape Verde Islands, geckos are the mainstay of the diet, supplemented by birds such as plovers, godwits, turnstones, weavers, and pratincoles. On a rocky islet off the coast of California, a clutch of four young were being reared on a diet of Leach's storm petrel (Oceanodroma leucorhoa). On bird-rich islands, a barn owl might include birds as some fifteen to twenty percent of its diet, while in grassland it will gorge itself on swarming termites, or on Orthoptera such as Copiphorinae katydids, Jerusalem crickets (Stenopelmatidae), or true crickets (Gryllidae). Smaller prey is usually torn into chunks and eaten completely, including bones and fur, while prey larger than about 100 grams (3.5 oz)—such as baby rabbits, Cryptomys blesmols, or Otomys vlei rats—is usually dismembered and the inedible parts discarded.

Compared to other owls of similar size, the barn owl has a much higher metabolic rate, requiring relatively more food. Relative to its size, barn owls consume more rodents. Studies have shown that an individual barn owl may eat one or more voles (or their equivalent) per night, equivalent to about fourteen percent of the bird's bodyweight. Excess food is often cached at roosting sites and can be used when food is scarce. This makes the barn owl one of the most economically valuable wildlife animals for agriculture. Farmers often find these owls more effective than poison in keeping down rodent pests, and they can encourage barn owl habitation by providing nesting sites.

=== Breeding ===
Barn owls living in tropical regions can breed at any time of year, but some seasonality in nesting is still evident. Where there are distinct wet and dry seasons, egg-laying usually takes place during the dry season, with increased rodent prey becoming available to the birds as the vegetation dies off. In arid regions, such as parts of Australia, breeding may be irregular and may happen in wet periods, with the resultant temporary increase in the populations of small mammals. In temperate climates, nesting seasons become more distinct, and there are some seasons of the year when no egg-laying takes place. In Europe and North America, most nesting takes place between March and June, when temperatures are increasing. The actual dates of egg-laying vary by year and by location, being correlated with the amount of prey-rich foraging habitat around the nest site. An increase in rodent populations will usually stimulate the local barn owls to begin nesting, and, consequently, two broods are often raised in a good year, even in the cooler parts of the owl's range.

=== Moulting ===
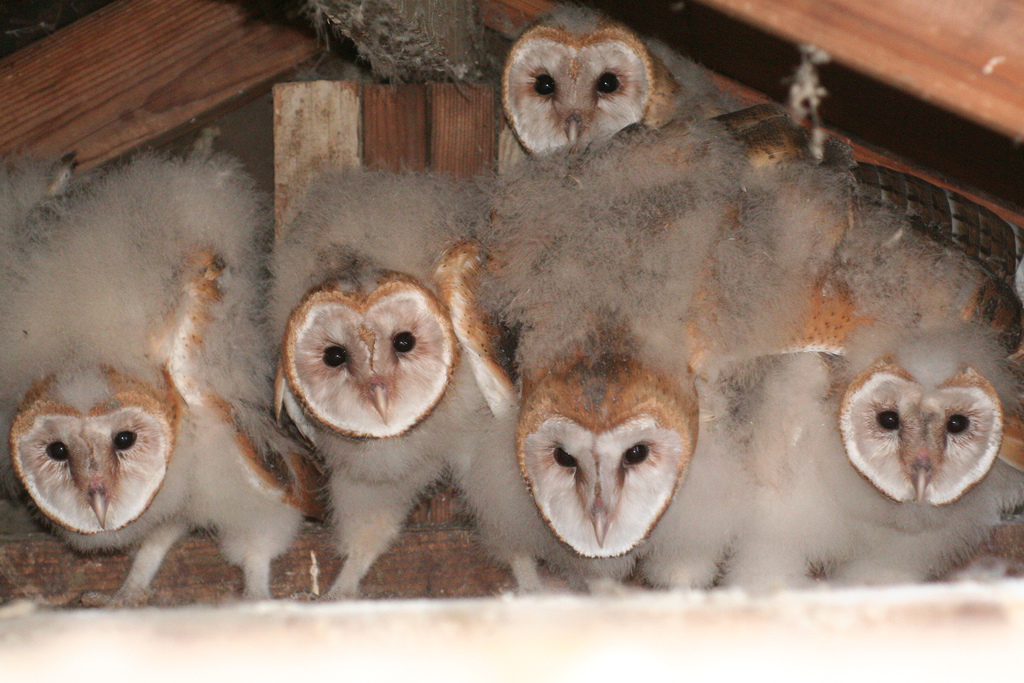
Brood prior to fledging, beginning to moult their nestling down

Feathers become abraded over time and all birds need to replace them at intervals. Barn owls are particularly dependent on their ability to fly quietly and manoeuvre efficiently. In temperate areas, the owls undergo a prolonged moult that lasts through three phases over a period of two years. The female starts to moult while incubating the eggs and brooding the chicks, a time when the male feeds her, so she does not need to fly much. The first primary feather to be shed is a central one, number 6, and it has regrown completely by the time the female resumes hunting. Feathers 4, 5, 7, and 8 are dropped at a similar time the following year and feathers 1, 2, 3, 9 and 10 in the bird's third year of adulthood. The secondary and tail feathers are lost and replaced over a similar timescale, again starting while incubation is taking place. In the case of the tail, the two outermost tail feathers are first shed, followed by the two central ones, the other tail feathers being shed the following year.

The male owl moults rather later in the year than the female, at a time when there is an abundance of food, the female has recommenced hunting, and the demands of the chicks are lessening. Unmated males without family responsibilities often start losing feathers earlier in the year. Their moult follows a pattern similarly prolonged as that of the female. The first sign that the male is moulting is often when a tail feather has been dropped at the roost. A consequence of moulting is the loss of thermal insulation. This is of little importance in the tropics, and barn owls there usually moult a complete complement of flight feathers annually. The hot-climate moult may still take place over a long period but is usually concentrated at a particular time of year outside the breeding season.

=== Predators and parasites ===
Three barn owl chicks threatening an intruder

Predators of the barn owl include large American opossums (Didelphis), the common raccoon, and similar carnivorous mammals, as well as eagles, larger hawks, and other owls. Among the latter, the great horned owl (Bubo virginianus), in the Americas, and the Eurasian eagle-owl (B. bubo) are noted predators of barn owls. Despite some sources claiming that there is little evidence of predation by great horned owls, one study from Washington found that 10.9% of the local great horned owl's diet was made up of barn owls. In Africa, the principal predators of barn owls are Verreaux's eagle-owls (Ketupa lactea) and Cape eagle-owls (Bubo capensis). In Europe, although less dangerous than the eagle-owls, the chief diurnal predators are the Eurasian goshawk (Astur gentilis) and the common buzzard (Buteo buteo). About 12 other large diurnal raptors and owls have also been reported as predators of barn owls, ranging from the similar-sized Cooper's hawk (Accipiter cooperii) and scarcely larger tawny owl (Strix aluco) to huge bald (Haliaeetus leucocephalus) and golden eagles (Aquila chrysaetos). As a result of improved conservation measures, the populations of the northern goshawk and eagle-owls are increasing, thus increasing the incidence of hunting on barn owls where the species coexist.

When disturbed at its roosting site, an angry barn owl lowers its head and sways it from side to side, or the head may be lowered and stretched forward and the wings outstretched and drooped while the bird emits hisses and makes snapping noises with its beak. Another defensive attitude involves lying flat on the ground or crouching with wings spread out.

Barn owls are hosts to a wide range of parasites. Fleas are present at nesting sites, and externally the birds are attacked by feather lice and feather mites, which chew the barbules of the feathers and which are transferred from bird to bird by direct contact. Blood-sucking flies, such as Ornithomyia avicularia, are often present, moving about among the plumage. Internal parasites include the fluke Strigea strigis, the tapeworm Paruternia candelabraria, several species of parasitic round worm, and spiny-headed worms in the genus Centrorhynchus. These gut parasites are acquired when the birds feed on infected prey. There is some indication that female birds with more and larger spots have a greater resistance to external parasites. This is correlated with smaller bursa of Fabricius, glands associated with antibody production, and a lower fecundity of the blood-sucking fly Carnus hemapterus, which attacks nestlings.

=== Lifespan ===
Collision with road vehicles is another cause of death and may result when birds forage on mown verges. Some of these birds are in poor condition and may have been less able to evade oncoming vehicles than fit individuals. In some locations, road mortality rates can be particularly high, with collision rates being influenced by higher commercial traffic, roadside verges that are grass rather than shrubs, and where small mammals are abundant. Historically, many deaths were caused by the use of pesticides, and this may still be the case in some parts of the world. Collisions with power-lines kill some birds, and being shot accounts for others, especially in Mediterranean regions.

== Status and conservation ==
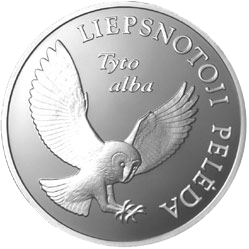
Barn owl on Lithuanian 5 litų silver coin (2002)

The barn owl is relatively common throughout most of its range and not considered globally threatened. If considered as a single global species, the barn owl is the second most widely distributed of all raptors, after only the peregrine falcon. It is wider-ranging than the also somewhat cosmopolitan osprey. Furthermore, the barn owl is likely the most numerous of all raptors, with the IUCN Red List assessor estimating a population possibly as large as nearly 10 million individuals. Severe local declines due to organochlorine (e.g., DDT) poisoning in the mid 20th century and rodenticides in the late 20th century have affected some populations, particularly in Europe and North America. Intensification of agricultural practices often means that the rough grassland that provides the best foraging habitat is lost. While barn owls are prolific breeders and able to recover from short-term population decreases, they are not as common in some areas as they used to be. A 1995–1997 survey put their British population at between 3,000 and 5,000 breeding pairs, out of an average of about 150,000 pairs in the whole of Europe. In the US, barn owls are listed as endangered species in seven Midwestern states (Ohio, Michigan, Indiana, Illinois, Wisconsin, Iowa, and Missouri), and in the European Community they are considered a Species of European Concern.

In Canada, barn owls are no longer common and are most likely to be found in coastal British Columbia south of Vancouver, having become extremely rare in a previous habitat, southern Ontario. In spite of a Recovery Strategy, particularly in 2007–2010 in Ontario, only a handful of wild, breeding barn owls existed in the province in 2018. This is primarily because of disappearing grasslands where the bird hunted in the past, but according to a study, also because of "harsh winters, predation, road mortality and use of rodenticides". The species is listed as endangered overall in Canada, due to loss of habitat and a lack of nesting sites.

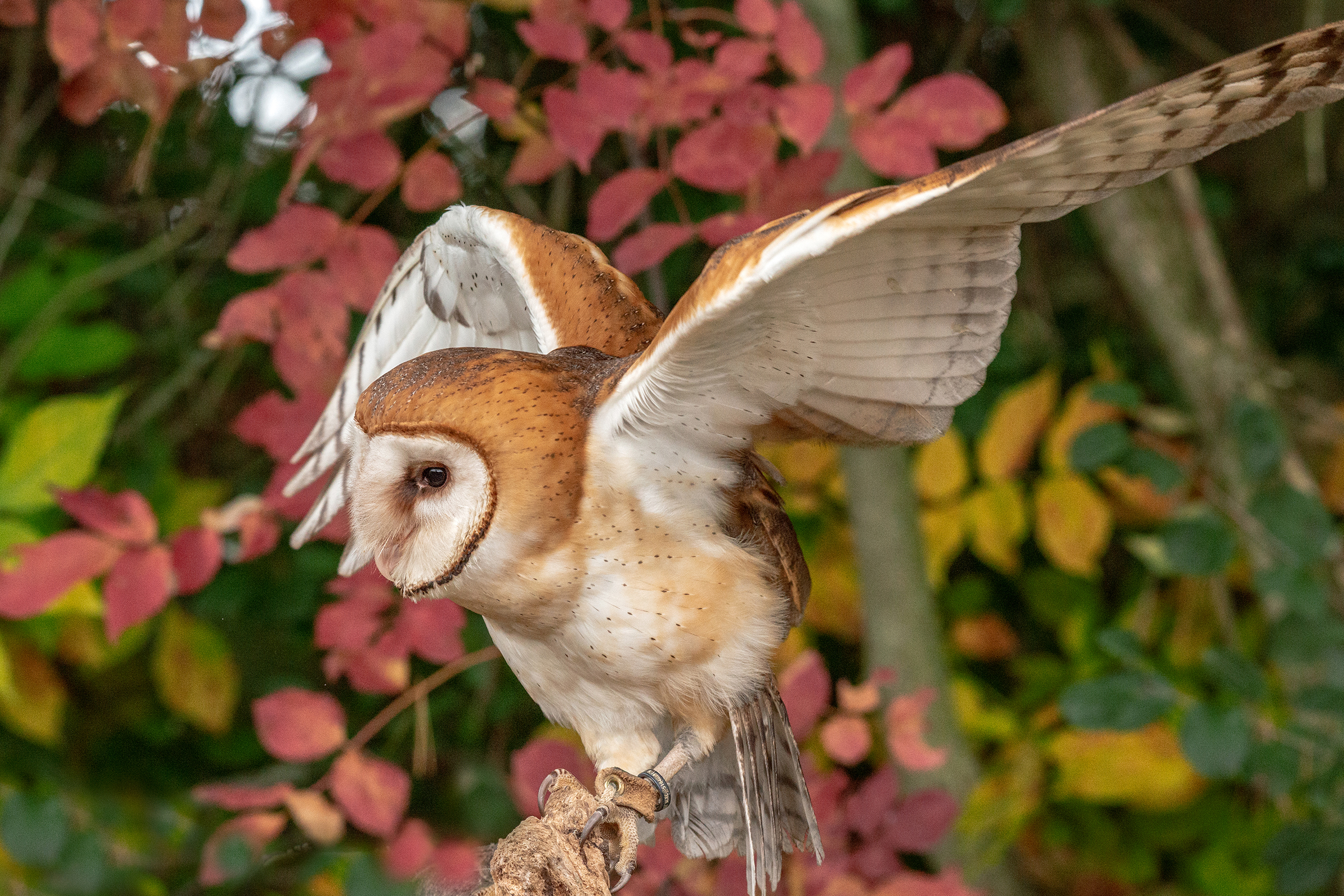
Captive barn owl near Lake Erie, in Ontario; the species has become extremely rare in this province.

In the Canary Islands, a somewhat larger number of these birds still seem to exist on the island of Lanzarote, but altogether this particular subspecies (T. a. gracilirostris, the Canary barn owl) is precariously rare: perhaps fewer than two hundred individuals still remain. Similarly, the birds on the western Canary Islands, which are usually assigned to this subspecies, have severely declined, and wanton destruction of the birds seems to be significant. On Tenerife, they seem relatively numerous, but on the other islands, as on Fuerteventura, the situation looks bleak. Due to the assignment to this subspecies of birds common in mainland Spain, the western Canary Islands population is not classified as threatened.

Nest boxes are used primarily when populations suffer declines. Although such declines have many causes, among them are the lack of available natural nesting sites. Early successes among conservationists have led to the widespread provision of nest boxes, which has become the most used form of population management. The barn owl accepts the provided nest boxes and sometimes prefers them to natural sites. The nest boxes are placed under the eaves of buildings and in other locations. The upper bound of the number of barn owl pairs depends on the abundance of food at nesting sites. Conservationists encourage farmers and landowners to install nest boxes by pointing out that the resultant increased barn owl population would provide natural rodent control. In some conservation projects, the use of rodenticides for pest control was replaced by the installation of nest boxes for barn owls, which has been shown to be a less costly method of rodent control.

=== Cultural aspects ===
Common names such as "demon owl", "death owl", "ghost owl", or "lich owl" (from lich, an old term for a corpse) show that rural populations in many places considered barn owls to be birds of evil omen. For example, the Tzeltal people in Mexico regard them as "disease givers". These owls do not "hoot", instead emitting raspy screeches and hissing noises, and their white face and underbelly feathers, visible as they fly overhead, make them look "ghostly". Consequently, they were often killed by farmers who were unaware of the benefits these birds bring. Negative perceptions can also be attributed to the false belief that they could eat large animals, such as chickens and cats. In Thailand, people believe that when the barn owl flies over or perches on the roof of any house, the inhabitants of that house will die. In South Africa, barn owls are often associated with witchcraft and are persecuted. In some South African cultures, these owls are used in muthi, a form of traditional medicine, and are believed to give special powers when consumed.

In India, Hindus consider the barn owl to be the mount and symbol of Lakshmi, goddess of wealth and fortune.

Mummified barn owls from Ancient Egypt have also been found.

In Brazilian folklore, barn owls (popularly known as Rasga-Mortalha, lit. 'Shroud-Ripper') are frequently associated with the mythical creature Matinta Pereira (or Matinta Perê), an entity commonly depicted as an aged hag or witch capable of transforming into a barn owl or striped cuckoo. According to popular belief, particularly in the north of Brazil, she torments urban and rural residents by screaming loudly throughout the night, stopping only when appeased with gifts like tobacco, coffee, and similar goods.

== Bibliography ==
- Bruce, M. D. (1999). "Family Tytonidae (Barn-owls)". In del Hoyo, J.; Elliott, A.; Sargatal, J. (eds.). Handbook of Birds of the World Volume 5: Barn-owls to Hummingbirds. Lynx Edicions. ISBN 978-84-87334-25-2.
- Ehrlich, Paul R.; Dobkin, David S.; Wheye, Darryl; Pimm, Stuart L. (1994). The Birdwatcher's Handbook: A Guide to the Natural History of the Birds of Britain and Europe. Oxford University Press. ISBN 978-0-19-858407-0.
- Shawyer, Colin (1994). The Barn Owl. Hamlyn. ISBN 978-0-600-57949-6.
- Svensson, Lars; Zetterström, Dan; Mullarney, Killian; Grant, Peter J. (1999). Collins Bird Guide. Harper & Collins. ISBN 978-0-00-219728-1.
- Taylor, Iain (2004). Barn Owls: Predator-prey Relationships and Conservation. Cambridge University Press. ISBN 978-0-521-54587-7.
- Witherby, H. F. (1943). Handbook of British Birds, Volume 2: Warblers to Owls. H. F. and G. Witherby.
