= Olive greenbul =

Olive greenbul may refer to:

- Baumann's olive greenbul, a species of bird found in West Africa
- a subspecies of Cabanis's greenbul, a bird found in east-central and south-central Africa
- Yellow-bearded greenbul, a species of bird found in West Africa
