= Brownbul =

Brownbul may refer to:

- Bristle-necked brownbul, alternate name for a species of bird found in eastern and south-eastern Africa
- Northern brownbul, a species of bird found in eastern and south-eastern Africa
- Nyasa terrestrial brownbul, a subspecies of bird found in eastern and south-eastern Africa
- Terrestrial brownbul, a species of bird found in eastern and south-eastern Africa
