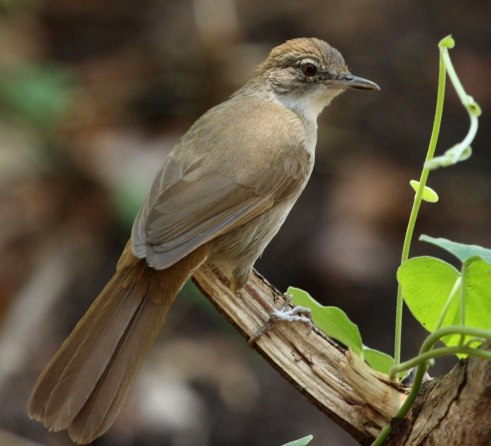
- Terrestrial brownbul (Phyllastrephus terrestris)

Scientific classification
- Kingdom: Animalia
- Phylum: Chordata
- Class: Aves
- Order: Passeriformes
- Family: Pycnonotidae
- Genus: Phyllastrephus; Swainson, 1832

Type species
- Phyllastrephus terrestris (terrestrial brownbul) Swainson, 1837

Species
- see text
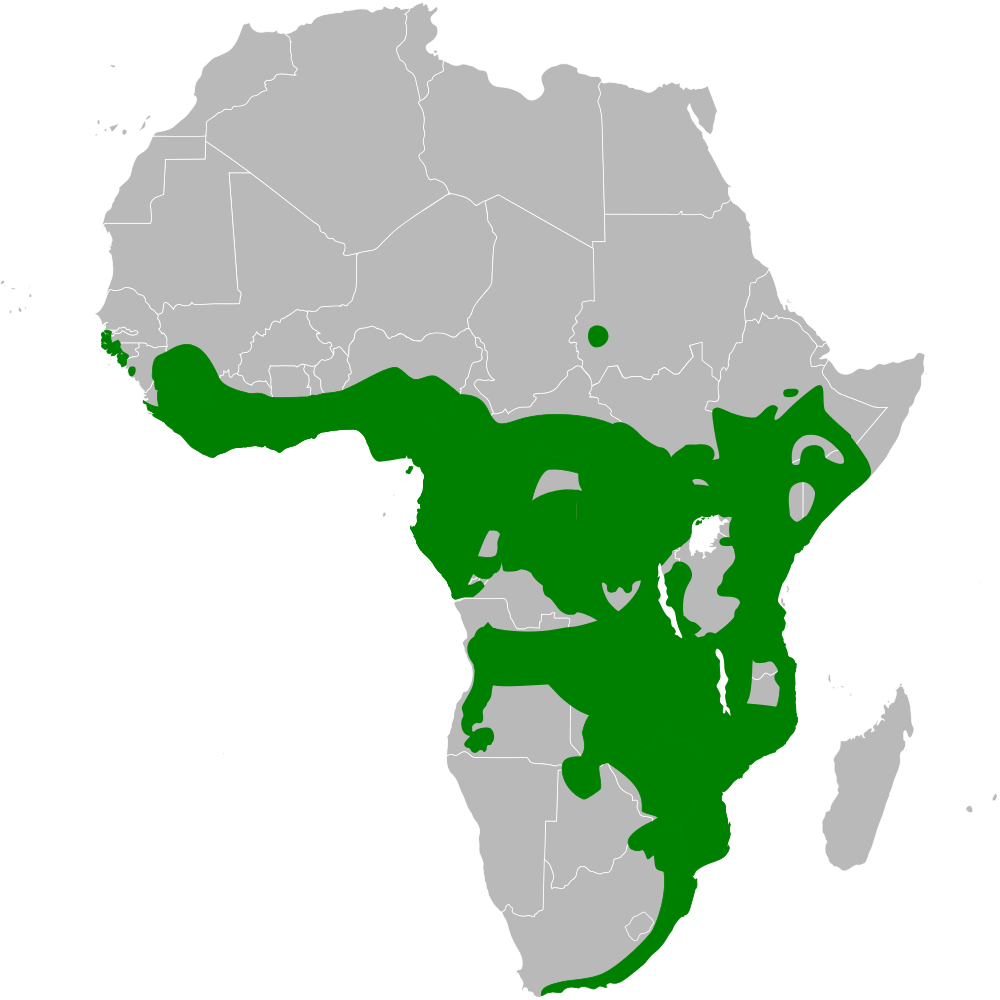

Synonyms
- Pyrrhurus

= Phyllastrephus =

Genus of birds

Phyllastrephus is a songbird genus in the bulbul family Pycnonotidae. Most of the species in the genus are typical greenbuls, though two are brownbuls, and one is a leaflove.

== Taxonomy and systematics ==
The genus Phyllastrephus was introduced by the English naturalist William Swainson in 1832 with Le Jaboteur (Levaillant), now the terrestrial brownbul, as the type species. The genus name combines the Ancient Greek phullon meaning "leaf" with strephō meaning "to toss" or "to turn".

=== Species ===
The genus contains the following 20 species:

Image	Scientific name	Common name	Distribution
	Lowland tiny greenbul	Phyllastrephus debilis	East Africa
	Montane tiny greenbul	Phyllastrephus albigula	Usambara and Nguru Mountains
	White-throated greenbul	Phyllastrephus albigularis	African tropical rainforest
-	Angola greenbul	Phyllastrephus viridiceps	northwestern Angola
-	Xavier's greenbul	Phyllastrephus xavieri	Congolian rainforests
	Icterine greenbul	Phyllastrephus icterinus	African tropical rainforest
	Terrestrial brownbul	Phyllastrephus terrestris	miombo, fynbos and east Africa
	Cameroon olive greenbul	Phyllastrephus poensis	Western High Plateau
	Northern brownbul	Phyllastrephus strepitans	northern East Africa
	Grey-olive greenbul	Phyllastrephus cerviniventris	miombo and East Africa
	Fischer's greenbul	Phyllastrephus fischeri	southern Somalia to northern Mozambique
	Cabanis's greenbul	Phyllastrephus cabanisi	miombo and East Africa
	Red-tailed leaflove	Phyllastrephus scandens	African tropical rainforest
	Sassi's olive greenbul	Phyllastrephus lorenzi	Congo Basin (north-east)
	Yellow-streaked greenbul	Phyllastrephus flavostriatus	Afromontane
-	Sharpe's greenbul	Phyllastrephus alfredi	south-western Tanzania, north-eastern Zambia and northern Malawi
	Grey-headed greenbul	Phyllastrephus poliocephalus	Western High Plateau
	Toro olive greenbul	Phyllastrephus hypochloris	East African montane forests and northern Victoria Basin
-	Baumann's greenbul	Phyllastrephus baumanni	sparsely present across southern West Africa
	Pale-olive greenbul	Phyllastrephus fulviventris	gallery forests of southwestern Central Africa

=== Former species ===
Several species from Madagascar that were formerly placed in the genus Phyllastrephus have now been moved into Bernieria and Xanthomixis. Commonly called the Bernieria and the tetrakas, these species are not bulbuls but Malagasy warblers similar to greenbuls due to convergent evolution. Formerly, some authorities also considered the following species (or subspecies) as species within the genus Phyllastrephus:

- Honeyguide greenbul (as Phyllastrephus indicator)
- Simple greenbul (as Pyrrhurus simplex)
- Swamp palm bulbul (as Phyllastrephus leucopleurus)
