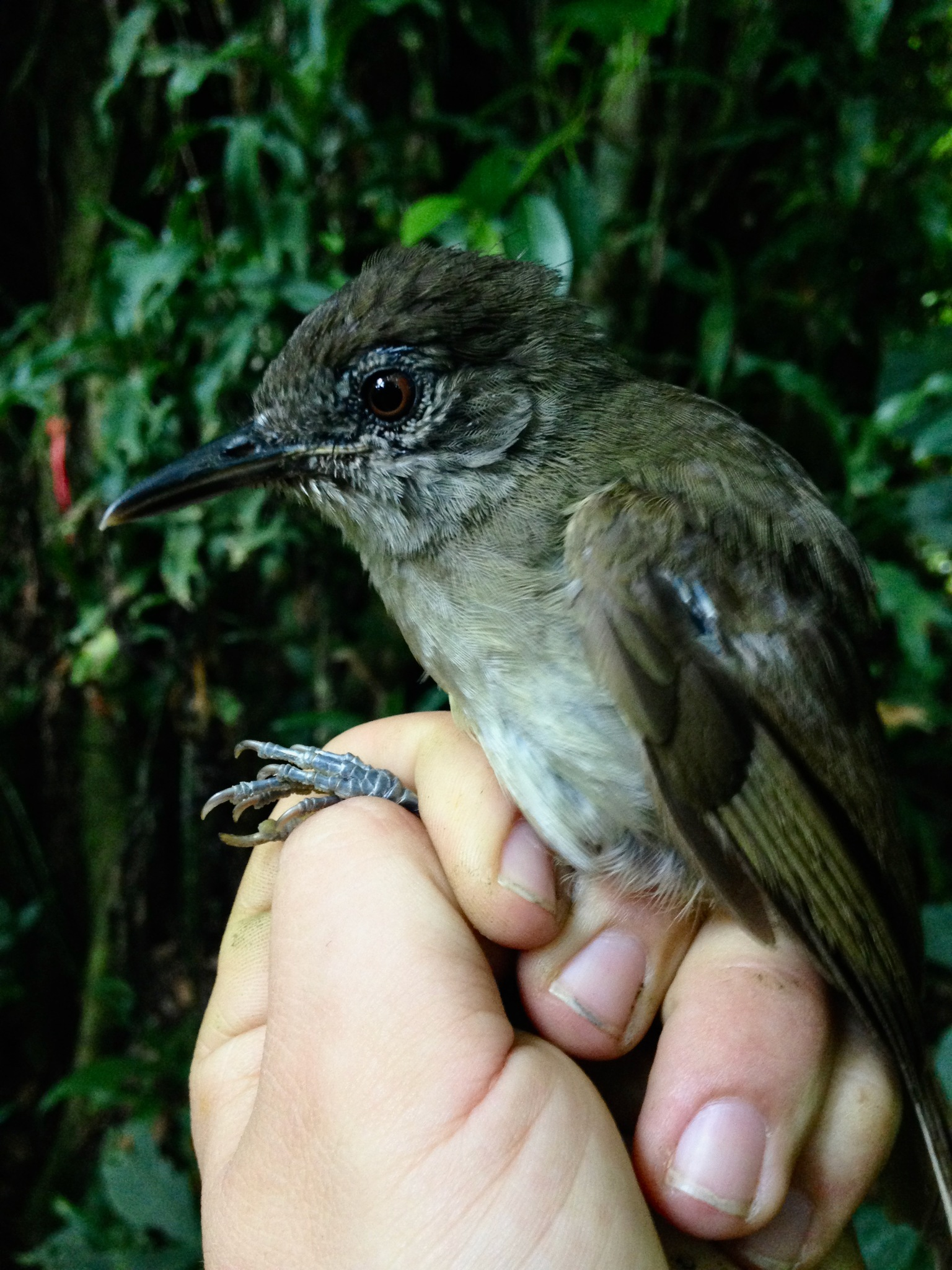

Conservation status
- Least Concern (IUCN 3.1)

Scientific classification
- Kingdom: Animalia
- Phylum: Chordata
- Class: Aves
- Order: Passeriformes
- Family: Pycnonotidae
- Genus: Phyllastrephus
- Species: P. poensis

Binomial name
- Phyllastrephus poensis Alexander, 1903
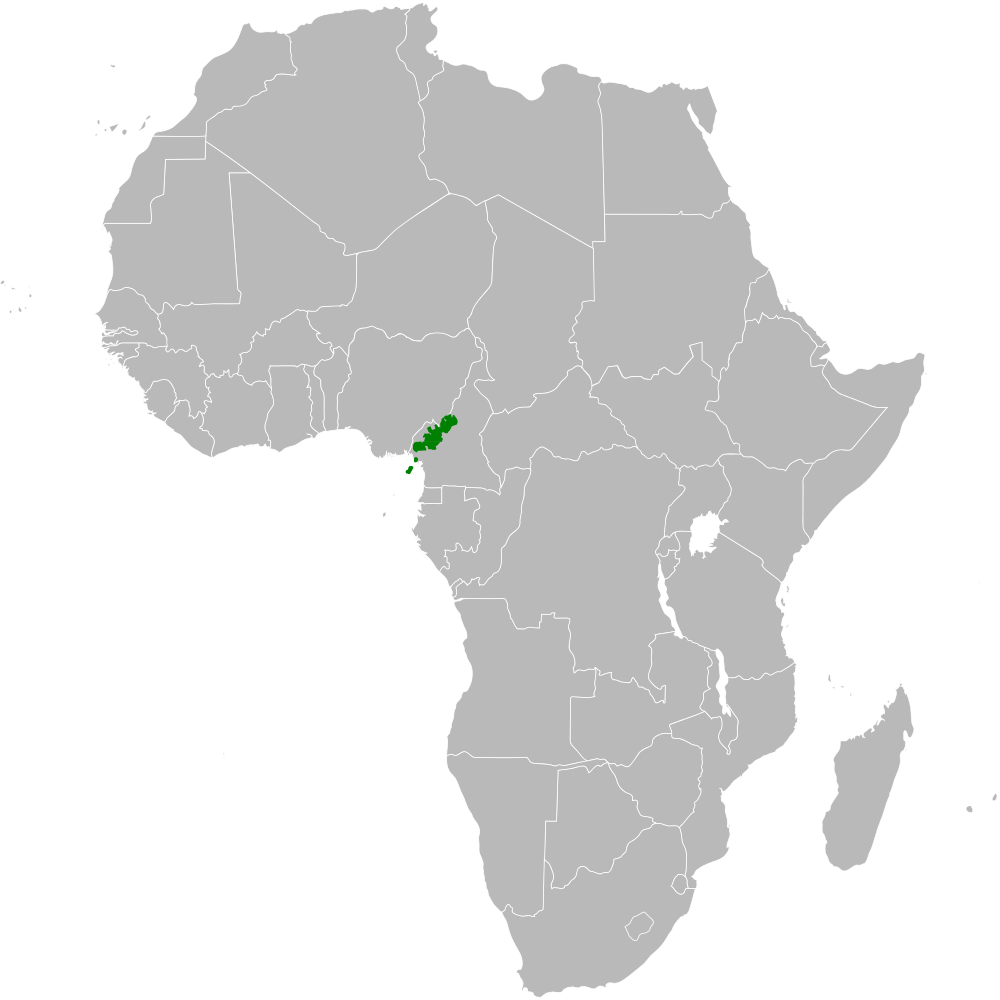

= Cameroon olive greenbul =

Species of songbird

The Cameroon olive greenbul (Phyllastrephus poensis), is a species of songbird in the bulbul family, Pycnonotidae.

It is found in the Cameroon line (including Bioko). Its natural habitat is subtropical or tropical moist montane forests. Alternate names for the Cameroon olive greenbul include Bioko greenbul and Cameroon olive bulbul.
