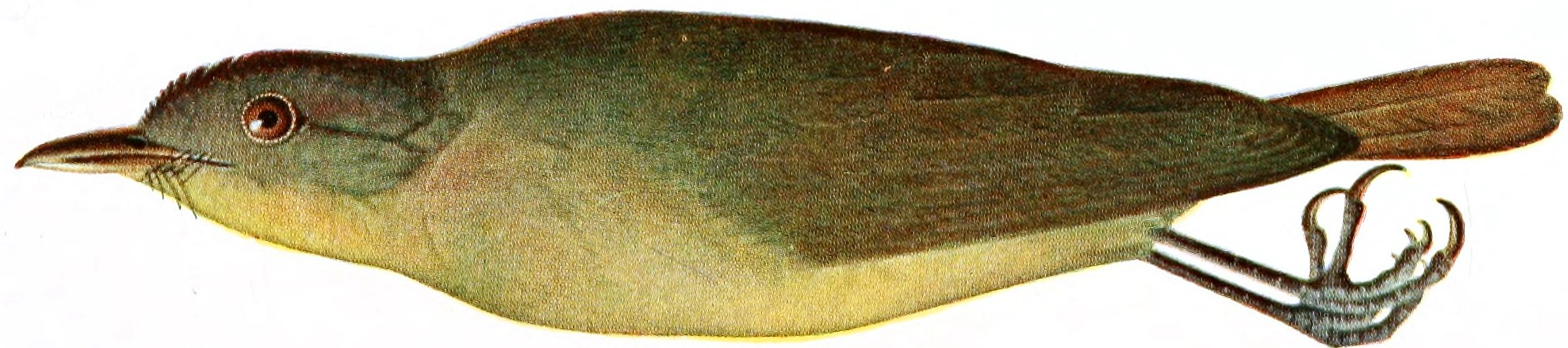
- Illustration of specimen in the Vienna Natural History Museum

Conservation status
- Least Concern (IUCN 3.1)

Scientific classification
- Kingdom: Animalia
- Phylum: Chordata
- Class: Aves
- Order: Passeriformes
- Family: Pycnonotidae
- Genus: Phyllastrephus
- Species: P. lorenzi

Binomial name
- Phyllastrephus lorenzi Sassi, 1914

Synonyms
- Phyllastrephus icterinus lorenzi

= Sassi's olive greenbul =

Species of bird

Sassi's olive greenbul (Phyllastrephus lorenzi) is a songbird in the bulbul family, Pycnonotidae.

It is found in north-eastern and eastern Democratic Republic of the Congo and in Uganda. Its natural habitats are subtropical or tropical moist lowland forest and subtropical or tropical moist montane forest. While it was formerly assessed as Near threatened and its population is decreasing due to habitat loss, it is now considered a species of Least concern by the IUCN.

== Taxonomy and systematics ==
Formerly, some authorities considered Sassi's olive greenbul to be a subspecies of the icterine greenbul. The scientific name commemorates the Austrian zoologist Ludwig Lorenz von Liburnau. Alternate names for Sassi's olive greenbul include Lorenz's greenbul, Sassi's bulbul and Sassi's greenbul.
