= Icterine =

Color resembling or relating to the family Icteridae

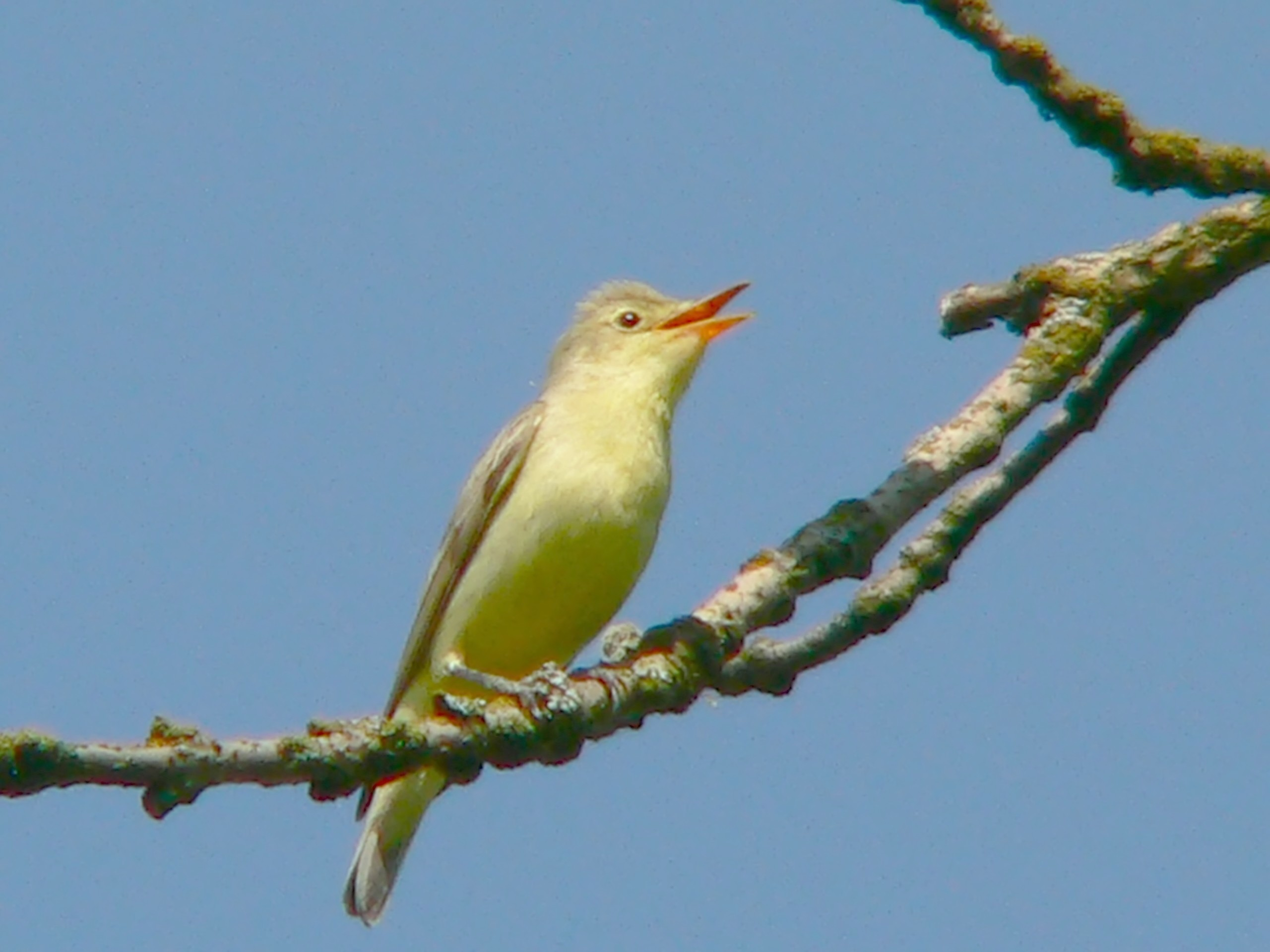
- Icterine warbler

Color coordinates
- Hex triplet: #FCF75E
- sRGB^{B} (r, g, b): (252, 247, 94)
- HSV (h, s, v): (58°, 63%, 99%)
- CIELCh_{uv} (L, C, h): (95, 89, 84°)
- Source: 99colors.net
- B: Normalized to [0–255] (byte)

Icterine /ˈɪktəriːn/ is a colour, described as yellowish, jaundice-yellow or marked with yellow. It is derived from Ancient Greek ikteros (jaundice), via the Latin ictericus. It is used as an adjective in the names of birds with yellowish plumage to describe their appearance, including the icterine warbler and icterine greenbul.

== See also ==
- Icterid
- List of colours
