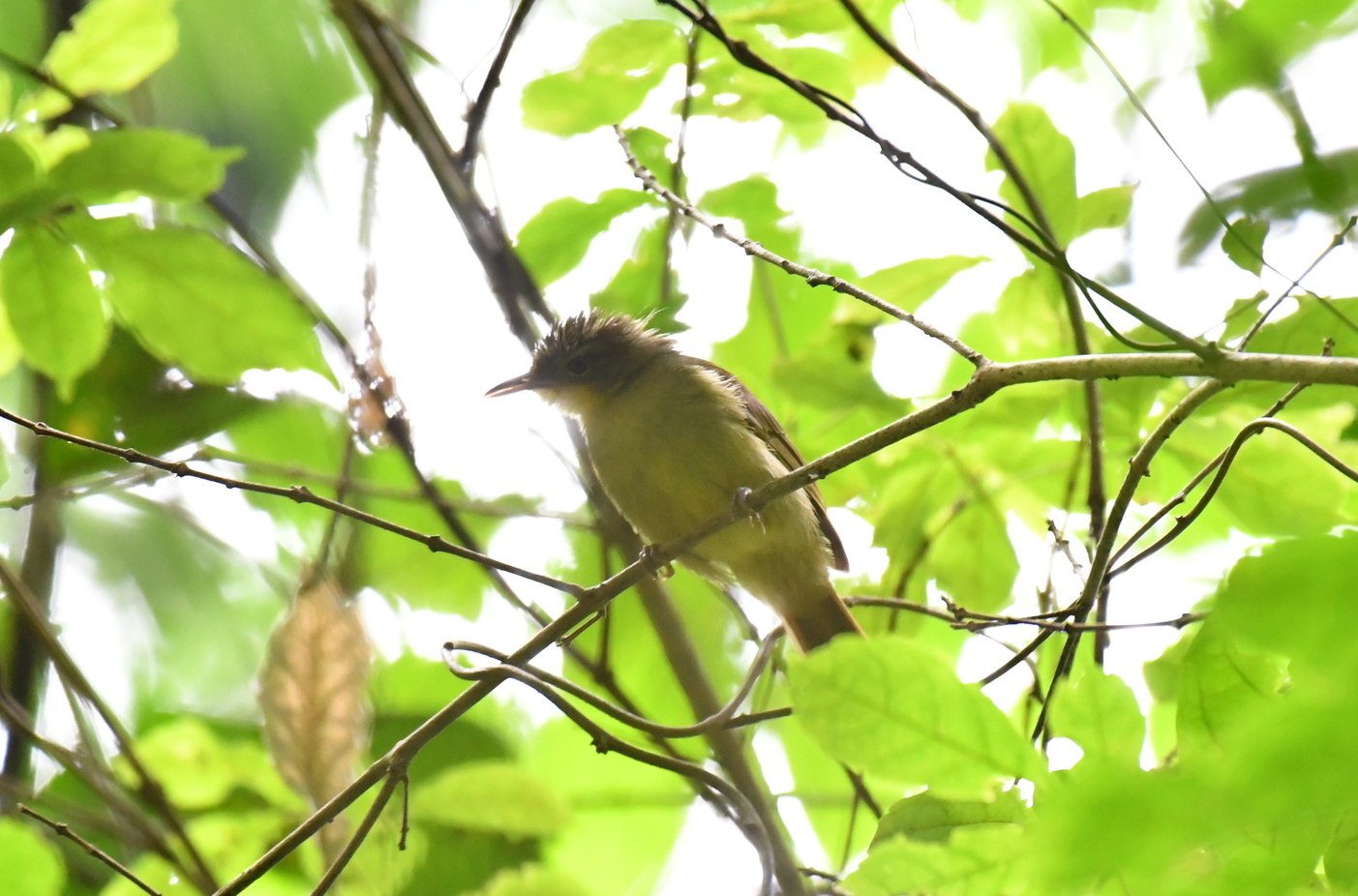

Conservation status
- Least Concern (IUCN 3.1)

Scientific classification
- Kingdom: Animalia
- Phylum: Chordata
- Class: Aves
- Order: Passeriformes
- Family: Pycnonotidae
- Genus: Phyllastrephus
- Species: P. icterinus

Binomial name
- Phyllastrephus icterinus (Bonaparte, 1850)
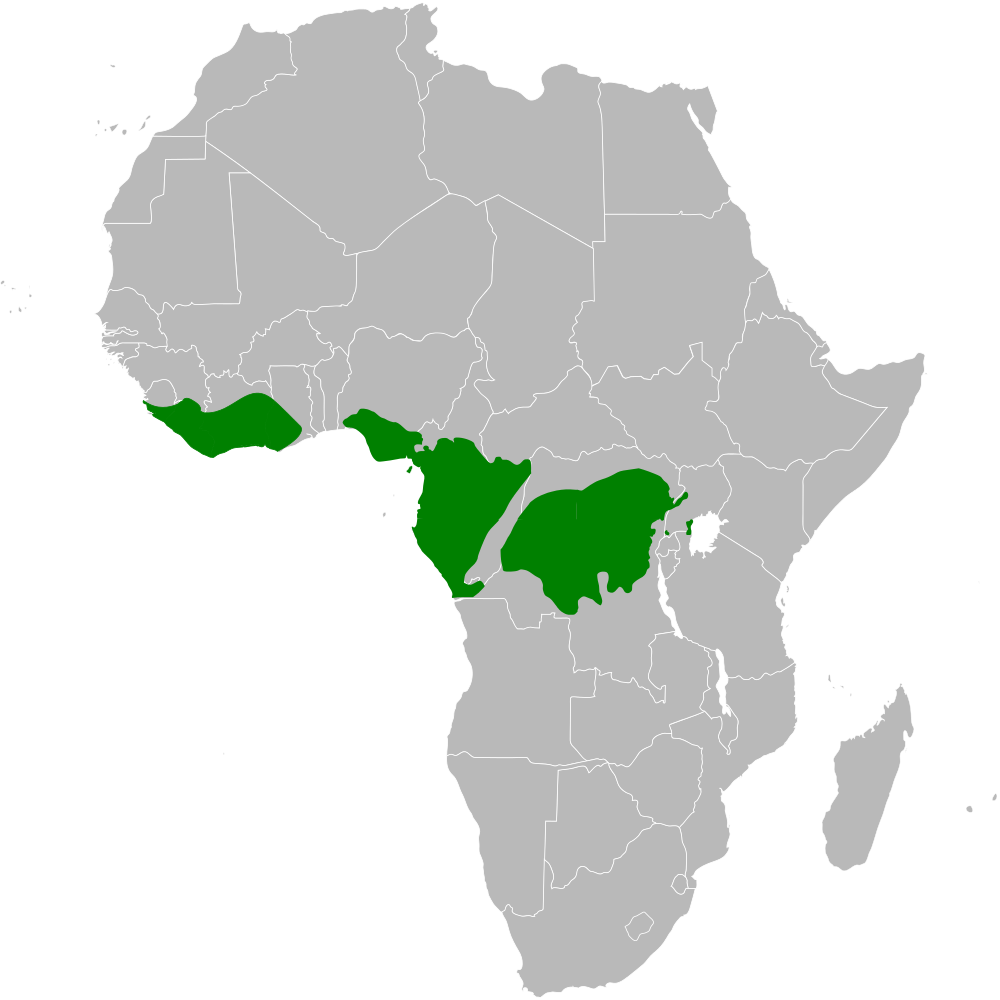

Synonyms
- Phyllastrephus leucolepis; Trichophorus icterinus

= Icterine greenbul =

Species of songbird

The icterine greenbul (Phyllastrephus icterinus) is a species of songbird in the bulbul family, Pycnonotidae. It is native to the African tropical rainforest.

== Taxonomy and systematics ==
The icterine greenbul was originally described in the genus Trichophorus (a synonym for Criniger). The term icterine refers to its yellowish colouration. Formerly, some authorities have considered Sassi's greenbul to be a subspecies of the icterine greenbul. Alternate names for the icterine greenbul include the lesser icterine bulbul.

=== Liberian greenbul ===
Until 2018, a rare colour morph of the icterine greenbul from the Cavalla forest in south-eastern Liberia was believed to be a separate species. The Liberian greenbul (Phyllastrephus leucolepis) was known from only a few sightings between 1981 and 1984, and a specimen collected in 1984. This specimen is now considered to have been a plumage aberration. A 2017 DNA analysis revealed that the bird(s) were common icterine greenbuls, albeit with unusual plumage colouring, which may have been caused by a nutritional deficiency. Alternative names for the Liberian greenbul included the spot-winged bulbul, spot-winged greenbul and white-winged greenbul.

== Distribution and habitat ==
The icterine greenbul is found in Africa from Guinea to Ghana; southern Nigeria to western and southern Uganda, eastern and central Democratic Republic of the Congo and extreme north-western Angola. Its natural habitats are subtropical or tropical dry forests, subtropical or tropical moist lowland forests, and moist savanna.
