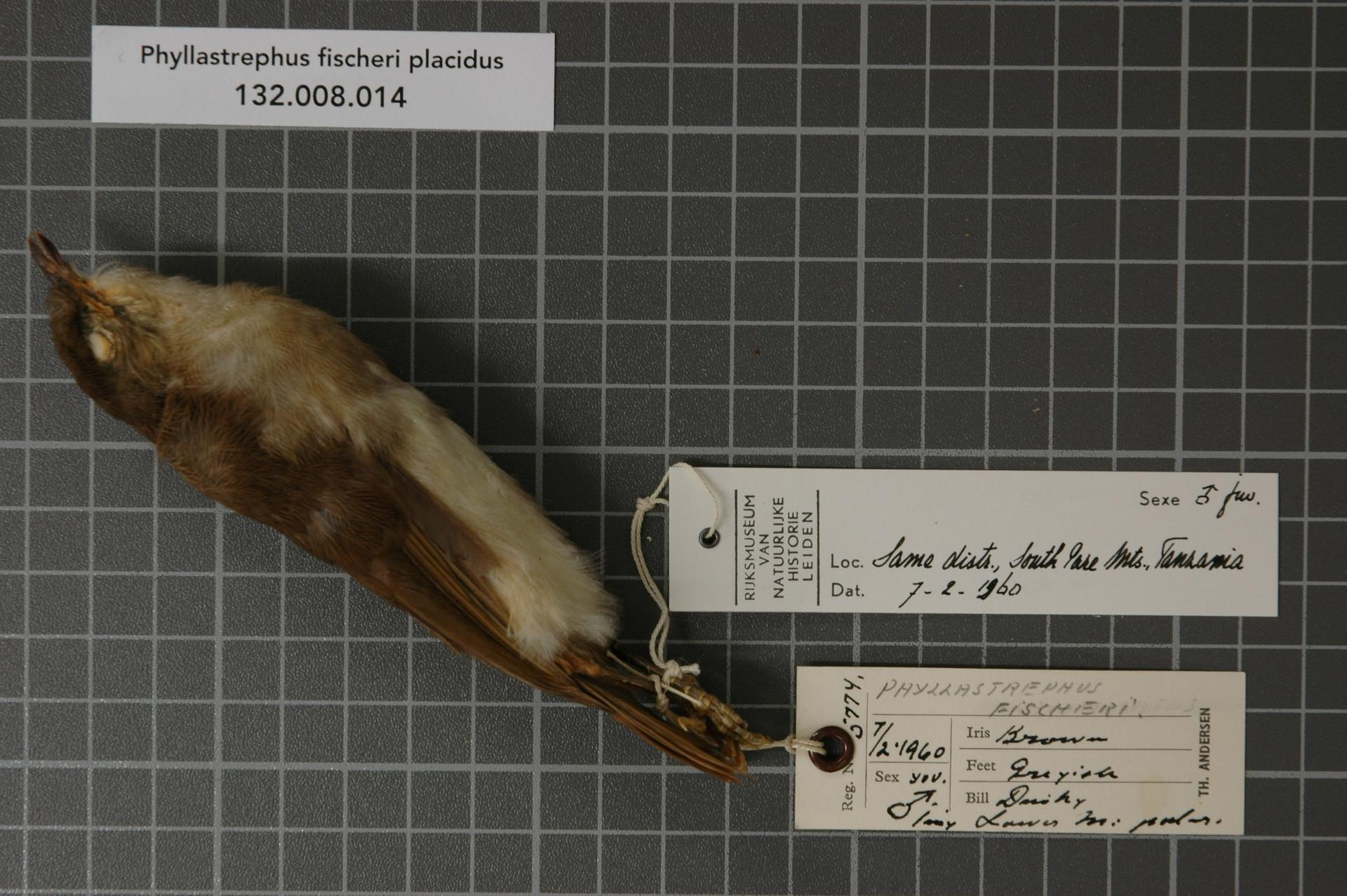

Conservation status
- Least Concern (IUCN 3.1)

Scientific classification
- Kingdom: Animalia
- Phylum: Chordata
- Class: Aves
- Order: Passeriformes
- Family: Pycnonotidae
- Genus: Phyllastrephus
- Species: P. fischeri

Binomial name
- Phyllastrephus fischeri (Reichenow, 1879)
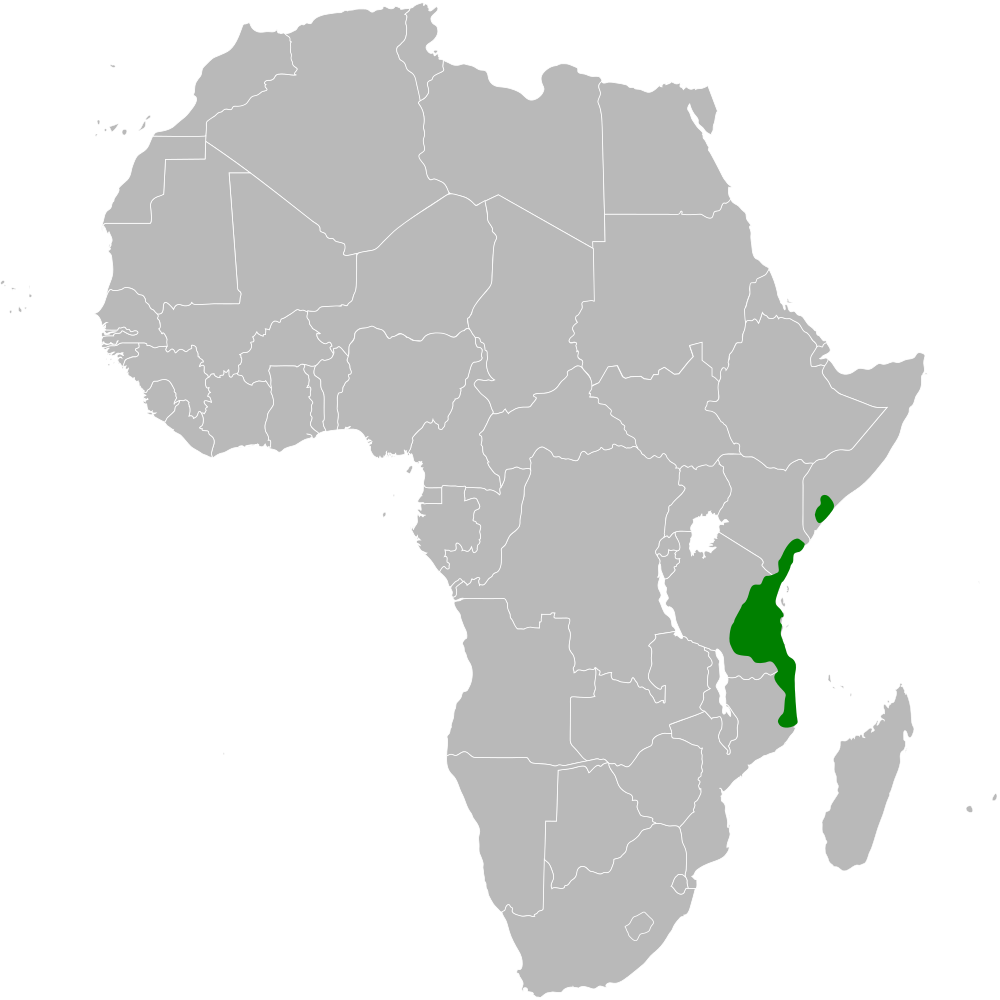

Synonyms
- Criniger Fischeri; Phyllastrephus alfredi itoculo

= Fischer's greenbul =

Species of songbird

Fischer's greenbul (Phyllastrephus fischeri) is a species of songbird in the bulbul family, Pycnonotidae. It is found in eastern Africa from southern Somalia to north-eastern Mozambique. Its natural habitats are subtropical or tropical dry forests, subtropical or tropical moist lowland forests, and subtropical or tropical moist shrubland.

== Taxonomy and systematics ==
Fischer's greenbul was originally described in the genus Criniger. Formerly, some authorities have considered it as a subspecies of Sharpe's greenbul and some have also considered Cabanis's greenbul and the placid greenbul to be subspecies of Fischer's greenbul. Both the common and the scientific name commemorate the 19th century German explorer of East Africa Gustav Fischer. Alternate names for Fischer's greenbul include the East Coast olive greenbul and Fischer's bulbul.
