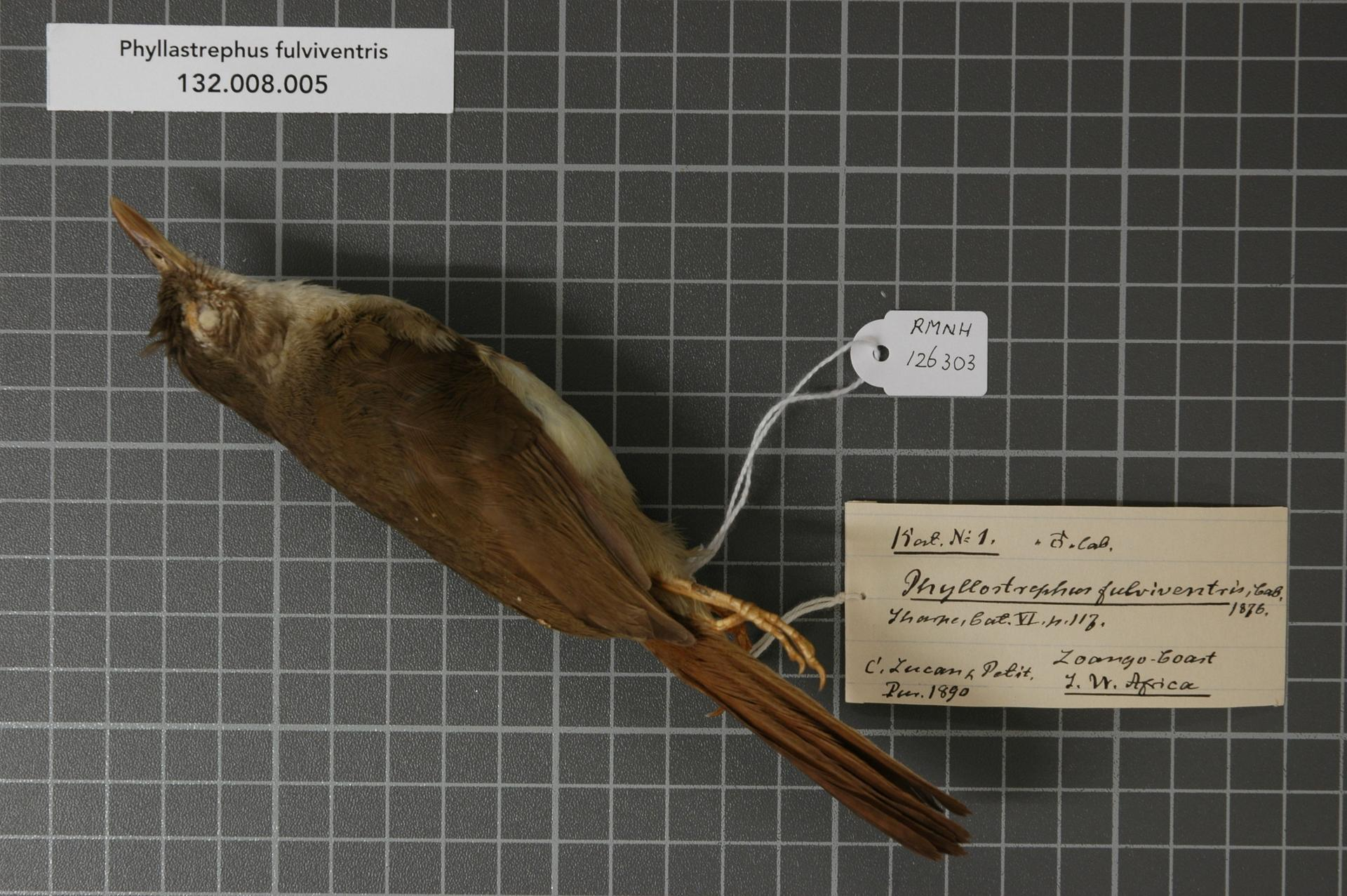

Conservation status
- Least Concern (IUCN 3.1)

Scientific classification
- Kingdom: Animalia
- Phylum: Chordata
- Class: Aves
- Order: Passeriformes
- Family: Pycnonotidae
- Genus: Phyllastrephus
- Species: P. fulviventris

Binomial name
- Phyllastrephus fulviventris Cabanis, 1876
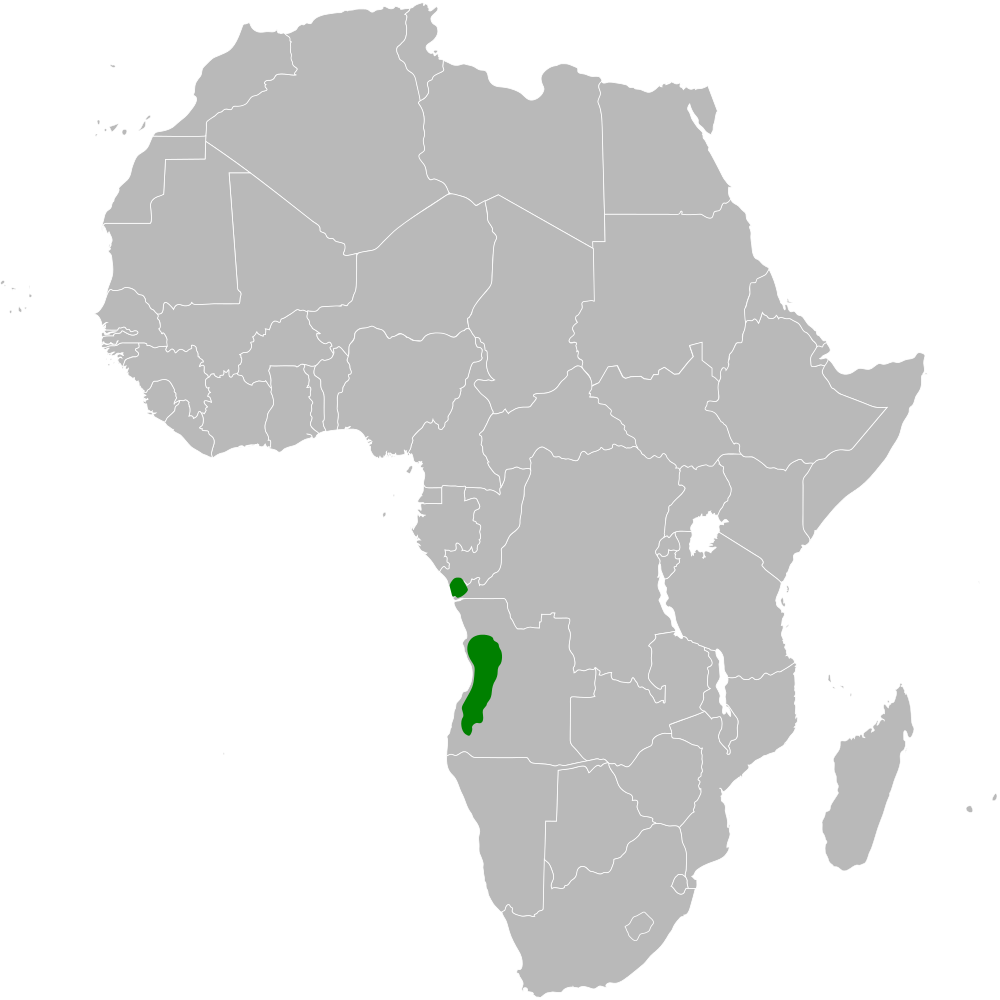

= Pale-olive greenbul =

Species of songbird

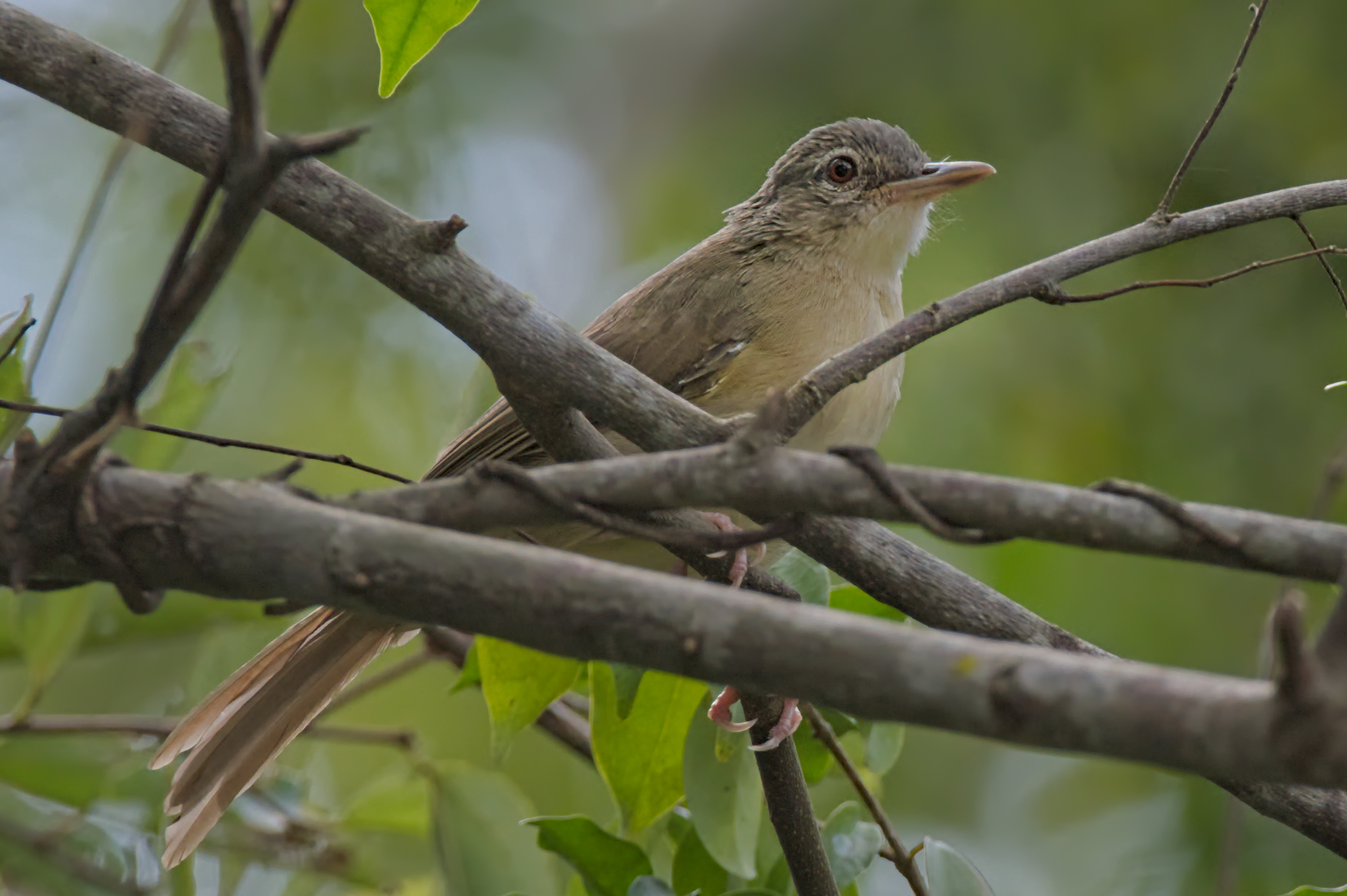
Pale-olive Greenbul

The pale-olive greenbul (Phyllastrephus fulviventris), or pale-olive bulbul, is a species of songbird in the bulbul family, Pycnonotidae.

== Distribution and habitat ==
It is found in western Angola, Gabon, southern Congo and extreme western Democratic Republic of the Congo. Its natural habitats are subtropical or tropical dry forests, subtropical or tropical moist lowland forests, and moist savanna.
