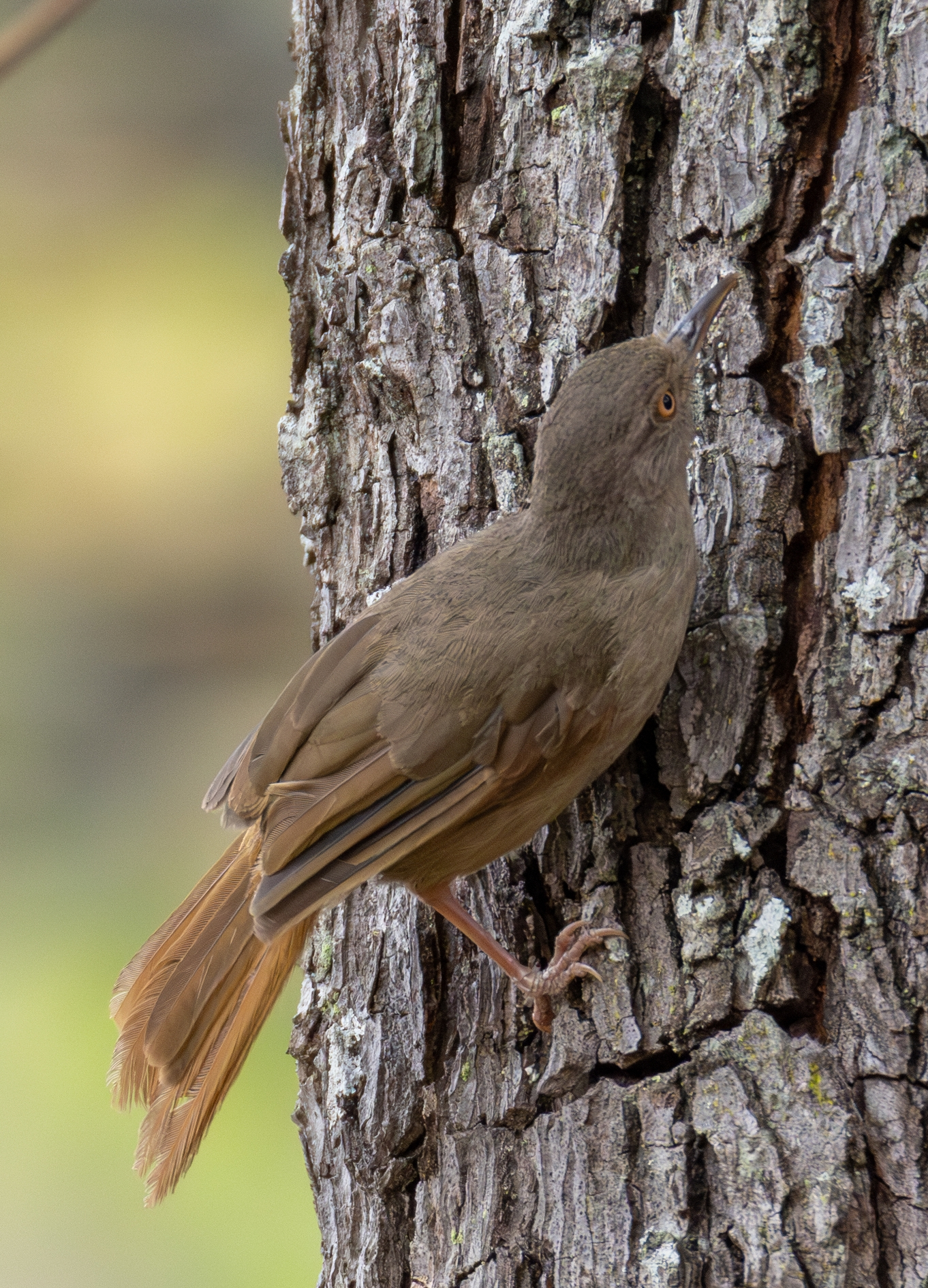

Conservation status
- Least Concern (IUCN 3.1)

Scientific classification
- Kingdom: Animalia
- Phylum: Chordata
- Class: Aves
- Order: Passeriformes
- Family: Pycnonotidae
- Genus: Phyllastrephus
- Species: P. cerviniventris

Binomial name
- Phyllastrephus cerviniventris Shelley, 1894
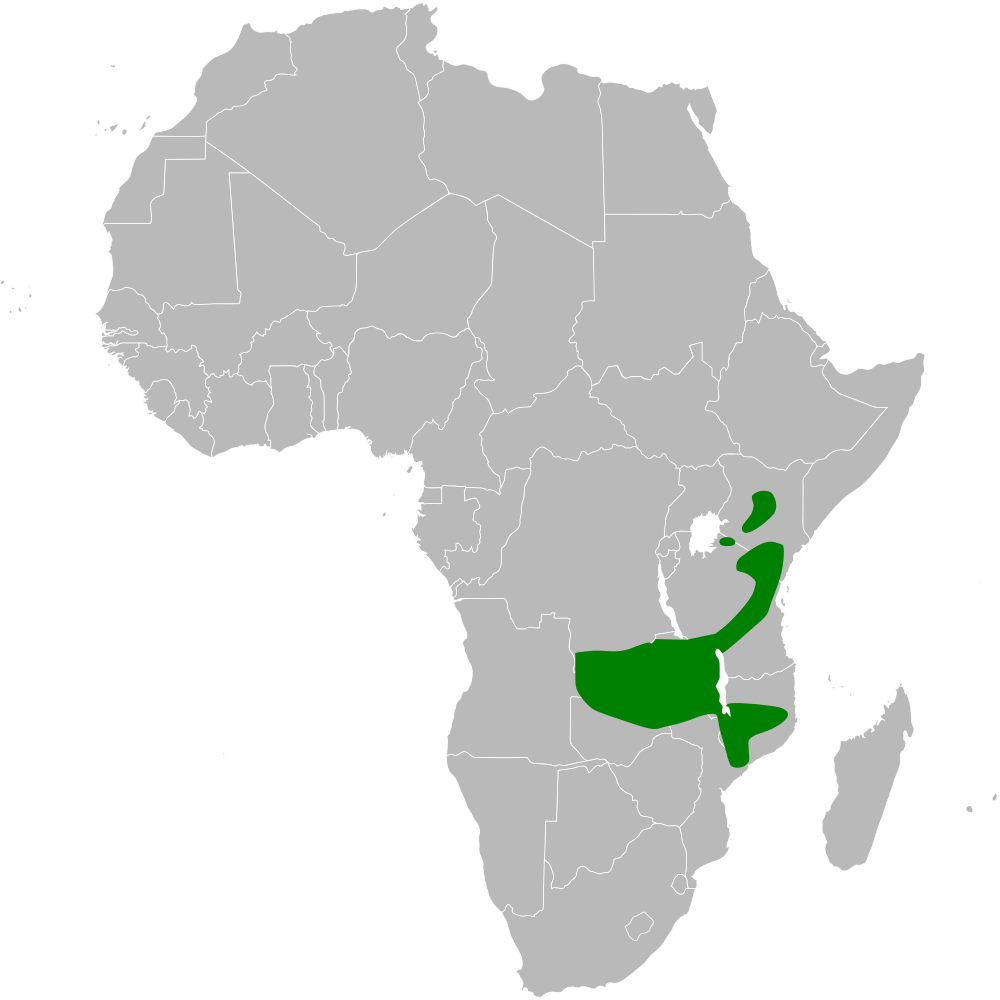

= Grey-olive greenbul =

Species of songbird

The grey-olive greenbul (Phyllastrephus cerviniventris), or grey-olive bulbul, is a species of songbird in the bulbul family, Pycnonotidae. It is found in eastern and south-central Africa. Its natural habitats are subtropical or tropical dry forests, subtropical or tropical moist lowland forests, and subtropical or tropical moist shrubland.

== Taxonomy and systematics ==
=== Subspecies ===
Two subspecies are recognized:

- P. c. schoutedeni - Prigogine, 1969: Found from central Kenya to central Mozambique, Zambia and eastern Angola
- P. c. cerviniventris - Shelley, 1894: Found in Katanga (south-eastern Democratic Republic of the Congo)
