= Baumann's olive greenbul =

Conservation status
- Least Concern (IUCN 3.1)

Scientific classification
- Kingdom: Animalia
- Phylum: Chordata
- Class: Aves
- Order: Passeriformes
- Family: Pycnonotidae
- Genus: Phyllastrephus
- Species: P. baumanni

Binomial name
- Phyllastrephus baumanni Reichenow, 1895
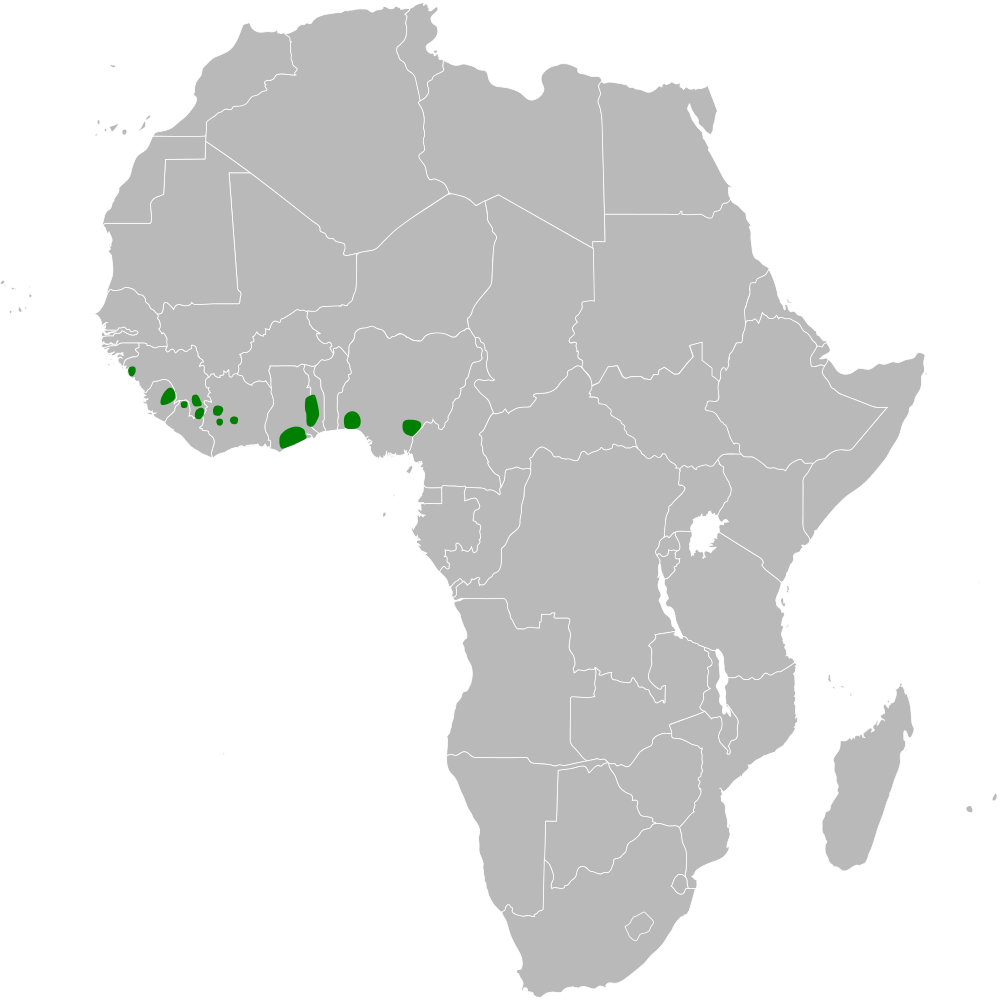

Synonyms
- Phyllastrephus eberneus

Species of songbird

Baumann's olive greenbul (Phyllastrephus baumanni) is a species of songbird in the bulbul family, Pycnonotidae. It is found in West Africa from Guinea and Sierra Leone to south-eastern Nigeria. Its natural habitats are subtropical or tropical moist lowland forests and moist savanna. Although little known, new research has shown it to be plentiful and widespread. Consequently, it is listed as a species of Least Concern by the IUCN. Alternate names for Baumann's olive greenbul include Baumann's bulbul, Baumann's greenbul and olive greenbul.

== Description ==
It has an olive-brown head and a gray face. Its eyes are brown. Its underparts are gray and its back is brown.
