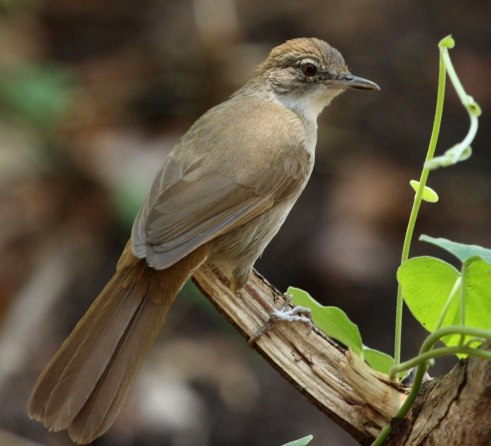
- Ngwenya, Eswatini

Conservation status
- Least Concern (IUCN 3.1)

Scientific classification
- Kingdom: Animalia
- Phylum: Chordata
- Class: Aves
- Order: Passeriformes
- Family: Pycnonotidae
- Genus: Phyllastrephus
- Species: P. terrestris

Binomial name
- Phyllastrephus terrestris Swainson, 1837
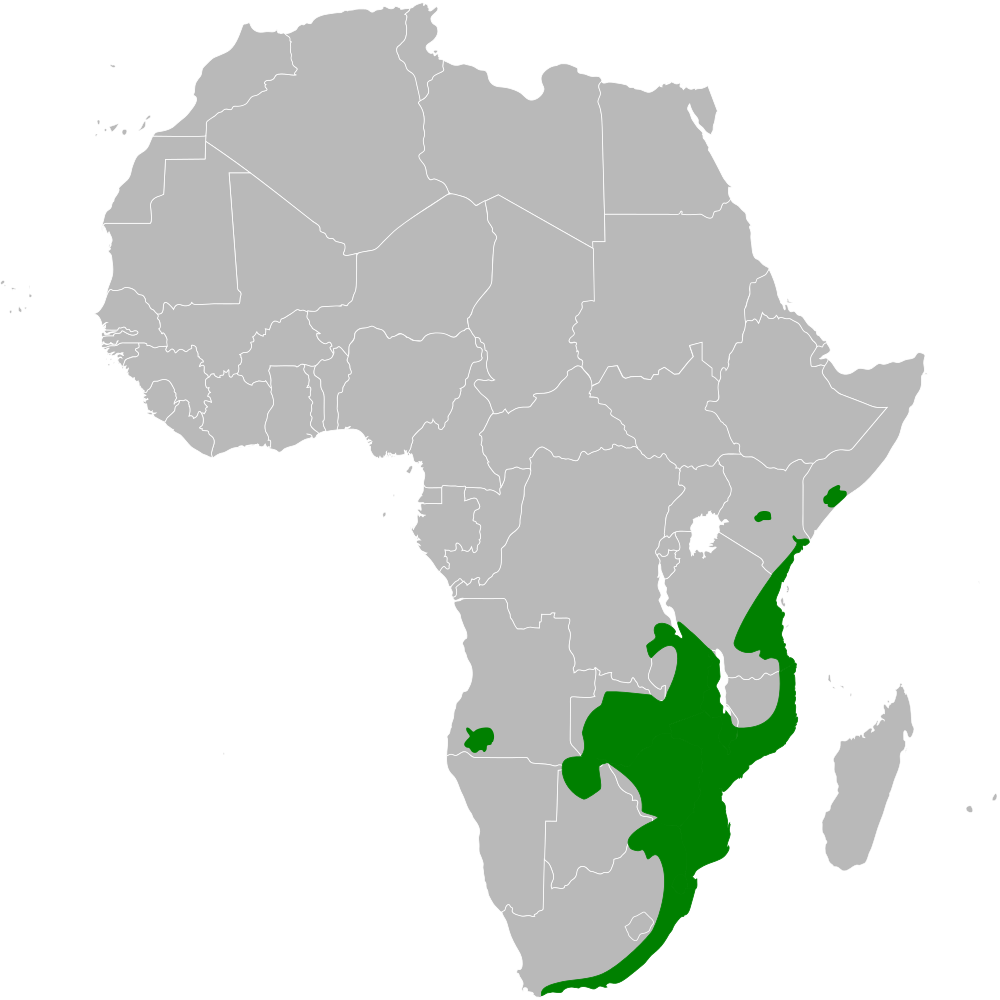

Synonyms
- Phyllastrephus capensis

= Terrestrial brownbul =

Species of songbird

The terrestrial brownbul (Phyllastrephus terrestris) is a species of songbird in the bulbul family, Pycnonotidae. It is found in eastern and south-eastern Africa. Its natural habitats are subtropical or tropical dry forest, subtropical or tropical moist lowland forest, and subtropical or tropical moist shrubland.

== Taxonomy and systematics ==
Alternate names for the terrestrial brownbul include the bristle-necked brownbul, brownbul, scrub bulbul and terrestrial bulbul.

=== Subspecies ===
Four subspecies are recognized:

- Nyasa terrestrial brownbul (P. t. suahelicus) - Reichenow, 1904: Found from southern Somalia to northern Mozambique
- P. t. intermedius - Gunning & Roberts, 1911: Found in southern Zimbabwe, southern Mozambique & adjacent eastern South Africa
- P. t. rhodesiae - Roberts, 1917: Found from south-western Angola, Zambia, south-eastern Democratic Republic of the Congo, and south-western Tanzania to northern Botswana, northern Zimbabwe and north-eastern Mozambique
- P. t. terrestris - Swainson, 1837: Found in eastern and southern South Africa
