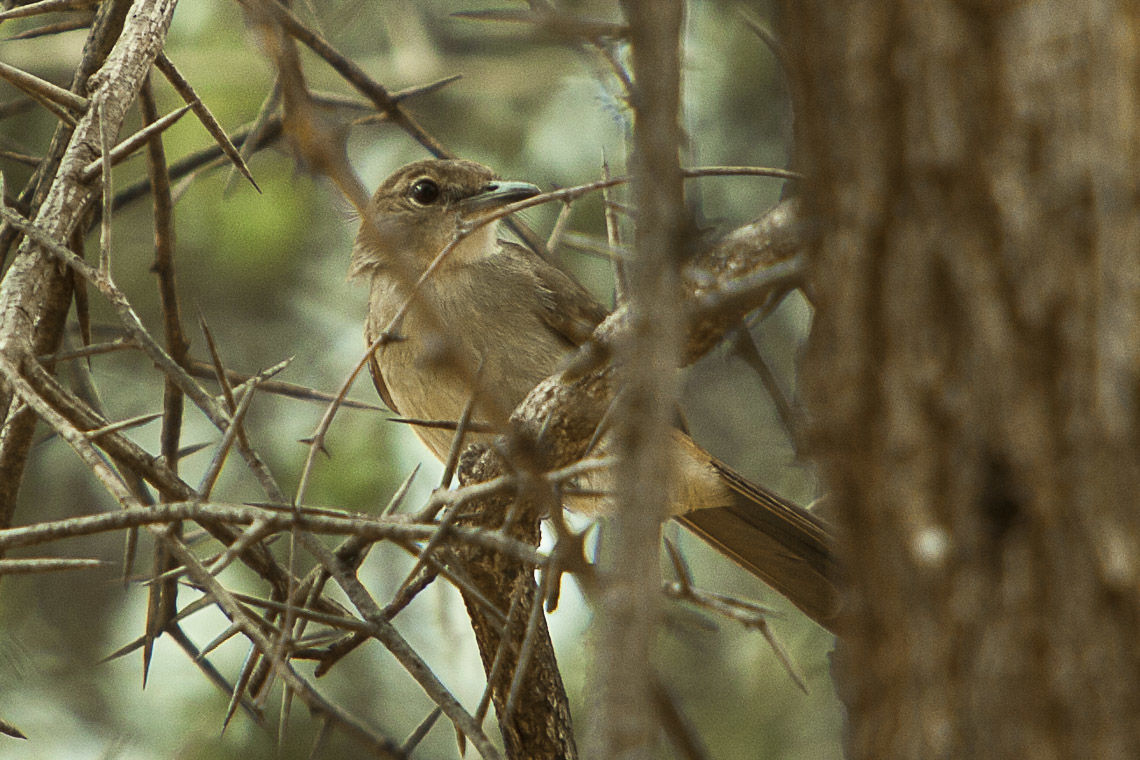

Conservation status
- Least Concern (IUCN 3.1)

Scientific classification
- Kingdom: Animalia
- Phylum: Chordata
- Class: Aves
- Order: Passeriformes
- Family: Pycnonotidae
- Genus: Phyllastrephus
- Species: P. strepitans

Binomial name
- Phyllastrephus strepitans (Reichenow, 1879)
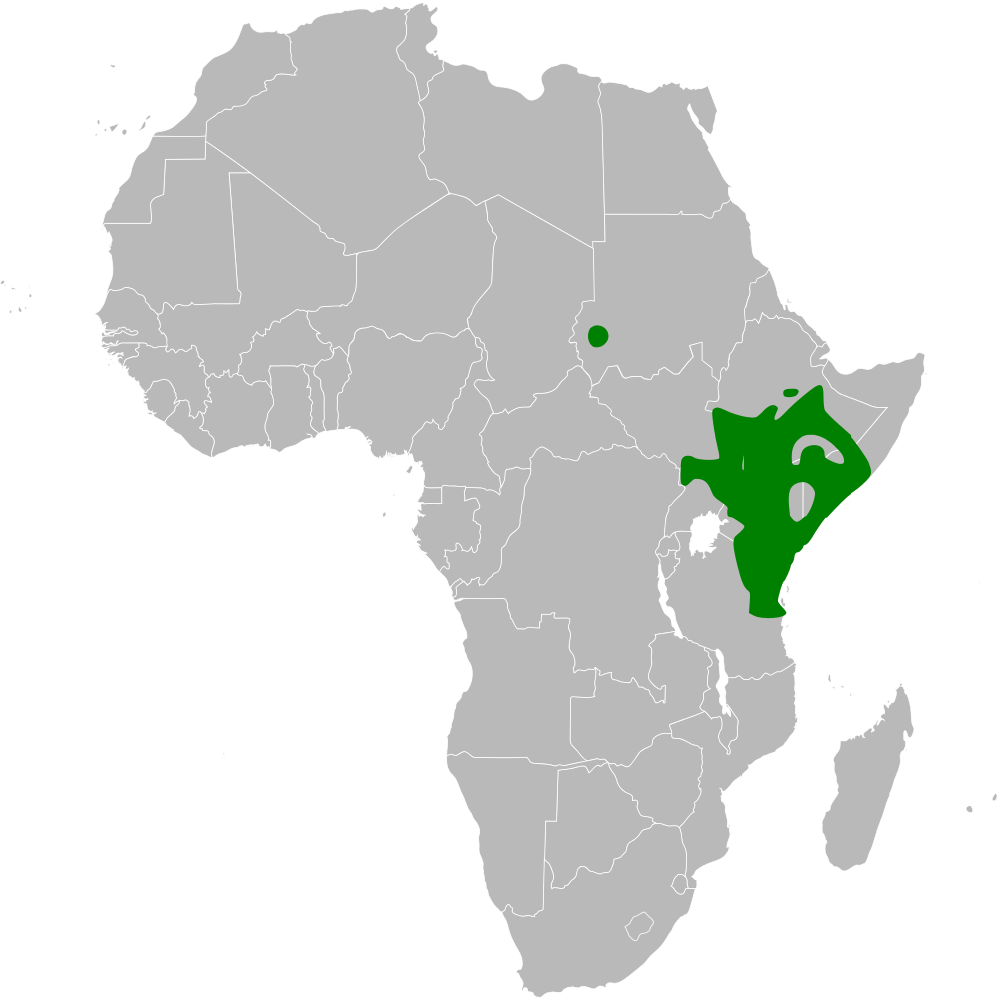

Synonyms
- Criniger strepitans

= Northern brownbul =

Species of songbird

The northern brownbul (Phyllastrephus strepitans) is a species of songbird in the bulbul family, Pycnonotidae. It is found in eastern Africa. Its natural habitats are subtropical or tropical dry forests, dry savanna, and subtropical or tropical dry shrubland. The northern brownbul was originally described in the genus Criniger. Alternate names include the East African scrub bulbul and northern brown bulbul.
