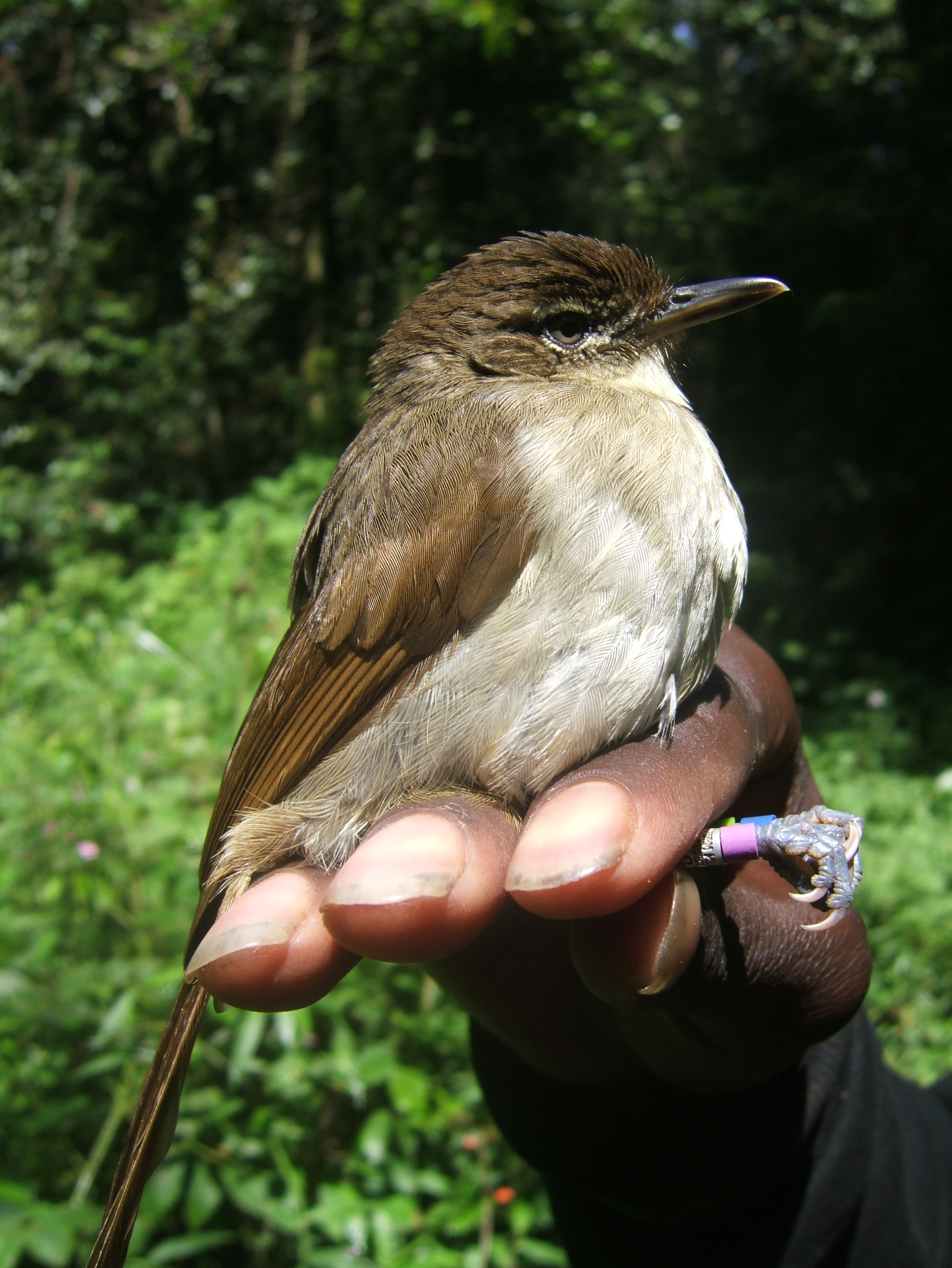
- In Taita Hills, Kenya

Conservation status
- Least Concern (IUCN 3.1)

Scientific classification
- Kingdom: Animalia
- Phylum: Chordata
- Class: Aves
- Order: Passeriformes
- Family: Pycnonotidae
- Genus: Phyllastrephus
- Species: P. cabanisi

Binomial name
- Phyllastrephus cabanisi (Sharpe, 1882)
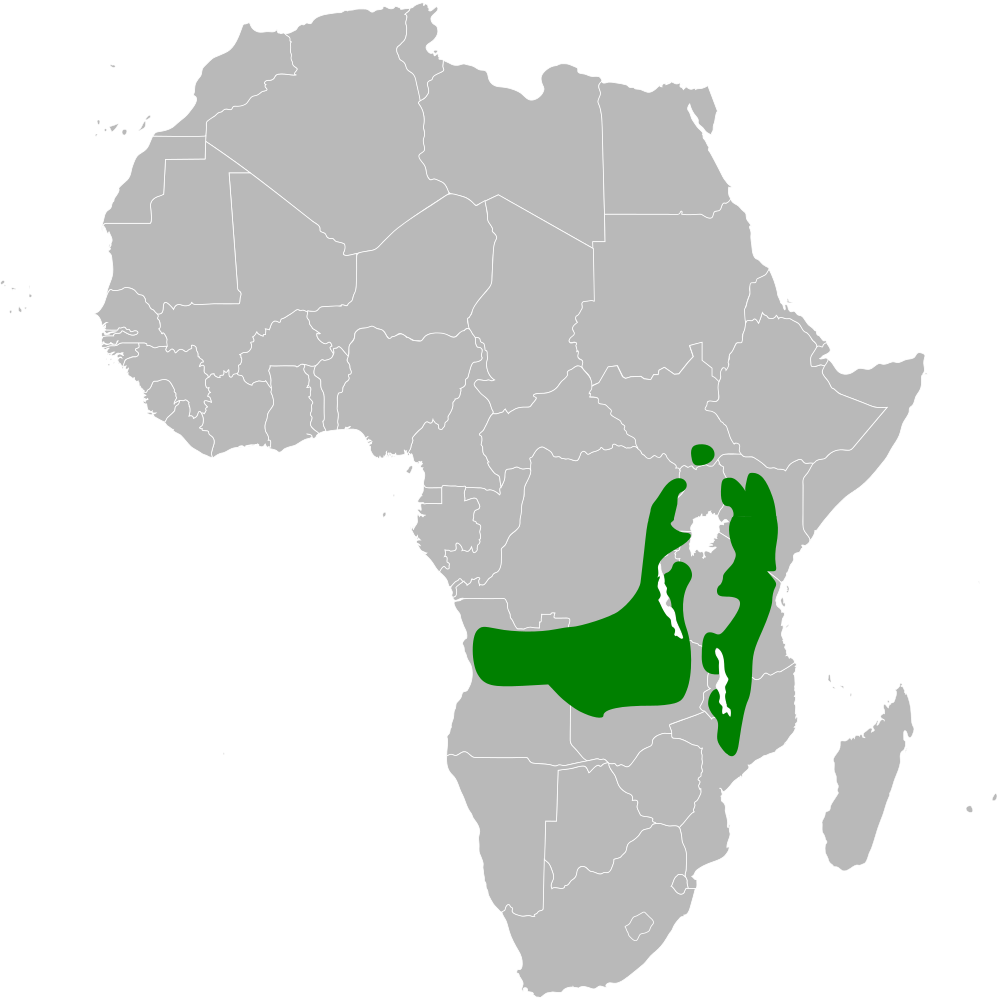

Synonyms
- Criniger cabanisi; Phyllastrephus fischeri cabanisi; Phyllastrephus modestus; Phyllastrephus sucosus

= Cabanis's greenbul =

Species of songbird

Cabanis's greenbul (Phyllastrephus cabanisi), also known as Cabanis's bulbul, is a species of songbird in the bulbul family, Pycnonotidae. It is found in east-central and south-central Africa. Its natural habitats are subtropical or tropical dry forest, subtropical or tropical moist lowland forest, subtropical or tropical moist montane forest, and subtropical or tropical moist shrubland.

== Taxonomy ==
Cabanis's greenbul was formally described in 1880 by the German ornithologist Jean Cabanis under the binomial name Trichophorus flaveolus based on a specimen that had been collected in Angola. Unfortunately, the scientific name was pre-occupied by Trichophorus flaveolus that had been introduced by John Gould in 1836 for the white-throated bulbul, now Alophoixus flaveolus. In 1882 the English ornithologist Richard Bowdler Sharpe proposed the replacement name, Criniger cabanisi, with the specific epithet chosen to honour Cabanis who had first described the species. Cabanis's greenbul is now one of 20 greenbuls placed in the genus Phyllastrephus that was introduced in 1832 by William Swainson. The genus name combines the Ancient Greek φυλλον/phullon meaning "leaf" with στρεφω/strephō meaning "to toss" or "to turn".

Three subspecies are recognised:

- P. c. cabanisi (Sharpe, 1882) – central Angola to southeast DR Congo, west Tanzania and north Zambia
- P. c. sucosus Reichenow, 1904 – south Sudan and west Kenya to east DR Congo and northwest Tanzania
- P. c. placidus (Shelley, 1899) – east Kenya through Tanzania to northeast Zambia, Malawi and northwest Mozambique

The subspecies P. c. placidus has sometimes been considered as a separate species, the placid greenbul.
