= White-tailed greenbul =

White-tailed greenbul may refer to:

- Honeyguide greenbul, a species of bird found in western and central Africa
- Sjöstedt's greenbul, a species of bird found in western and central Africa
- Swamp palm bulbul, a species of bird found in western and central Africa
