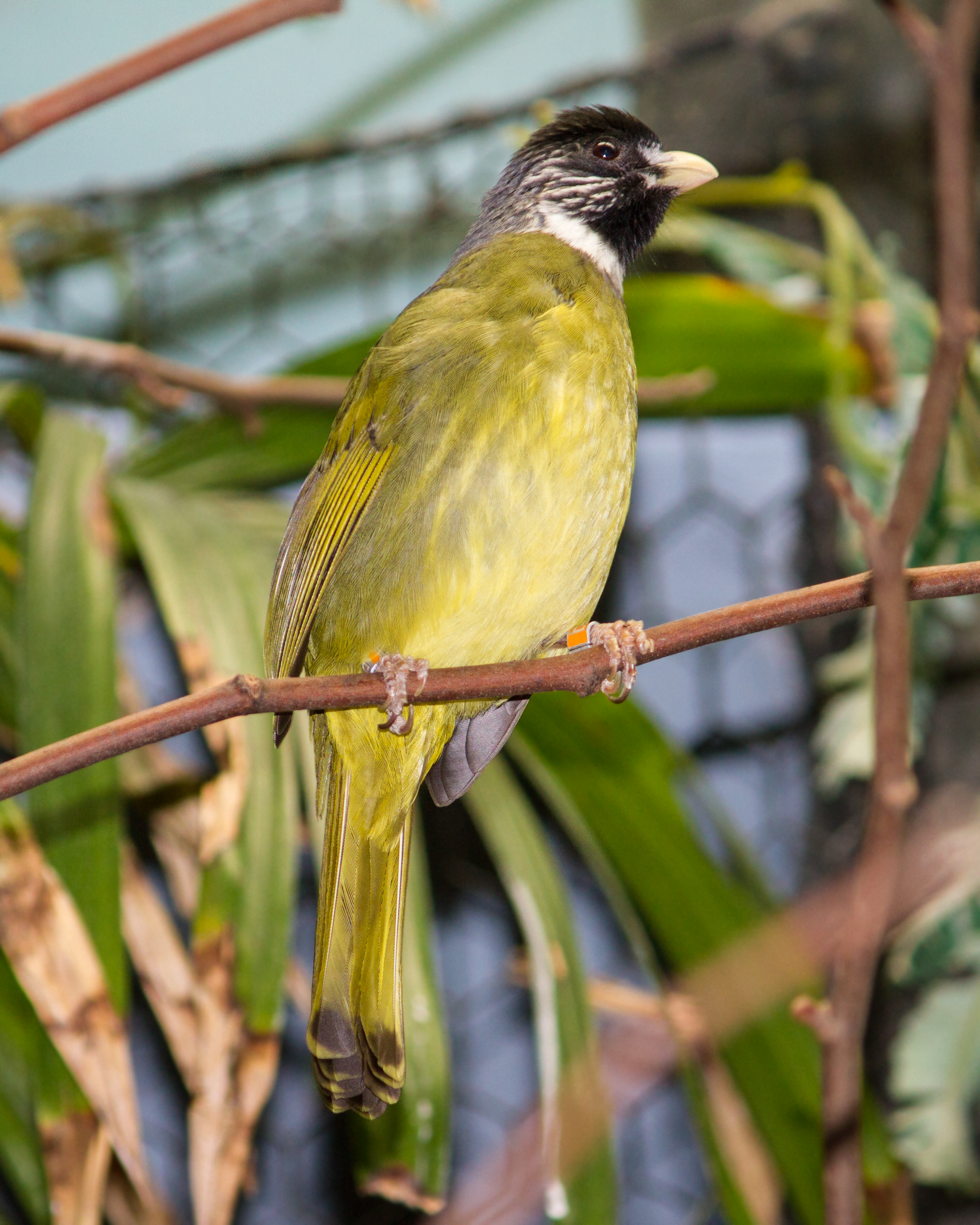
- At the Cincinnati Zoo

Conservation status
- Least Concern (IUCN 3.1)

Scientific classification
- Kingdom: Animalia
- Phylum: Chordata
- Class: Aves
- Order: Passeriformes
- Family: Pycnonotidae
- Genus: Spizixos
- Species: S. semitorques

Binomial name
- Spizixos semitorques R. Swinhoe, 1861
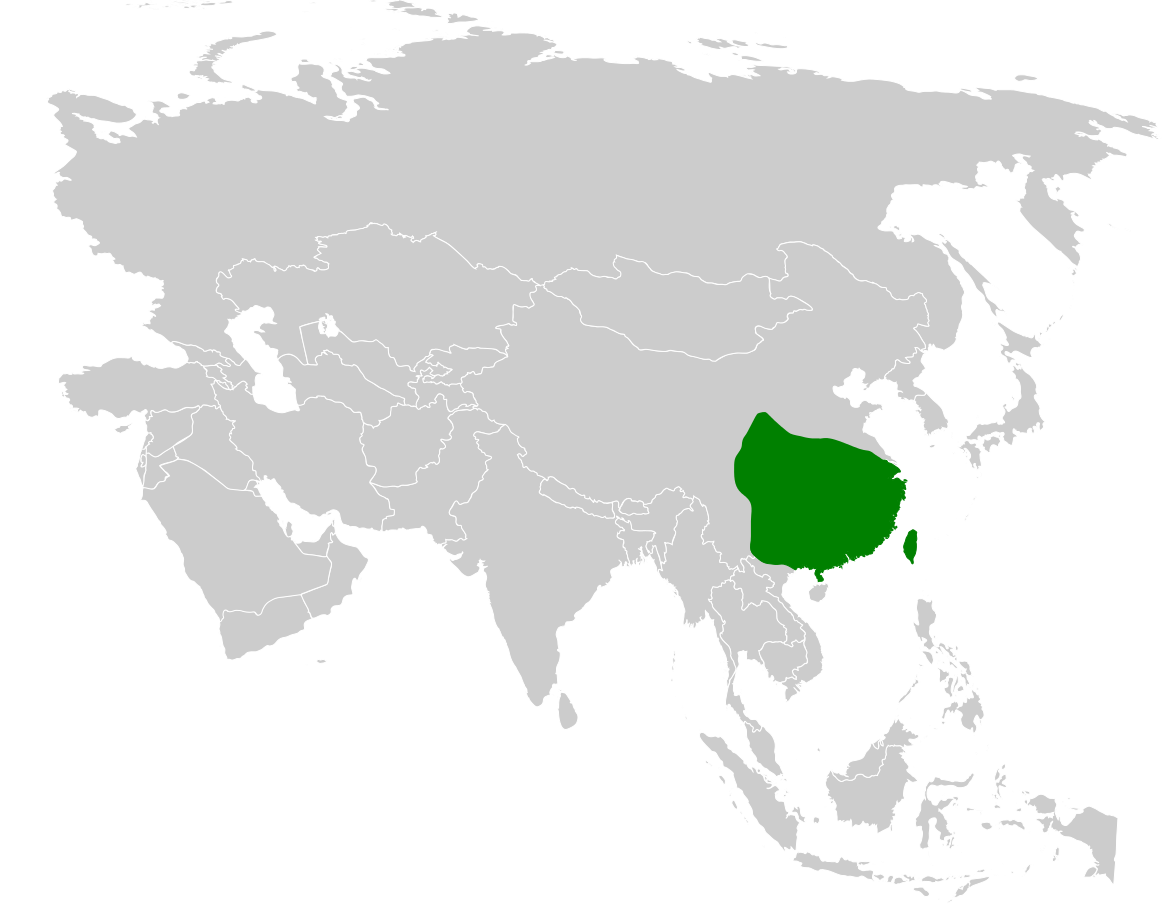

Synonyms
- Spizixus cinereicapillus

= Collared finchbill =

Species of songbird

The collared finchbill (Spizixos semitorques) is a species of songbird in the bulbul family, Pycnonotidae. It is found in China, Taiwan, Japan and Vietnam.

The species favors forested hills at moderate elevations. Primarily a frugivore, the collared finchbill also eats seeds and insects. The birds are typically monogamous, with females building nests in trees in which to lay their eggs.

== Diet ==
They eat fruit, including Hedera nepalensis and Paederia scandens.

== Taxonomy and systematics ==
Alternate names for the collared finchbill include the black-headed finch-bill, Chinese finch-bill, Japanese finch-bill, collared finch-billed bulbul and Swinhoe's finch-billed bulbul.

=== Subspecies ===
Two subspecies are recognized:

- S. s. semitorques - R. Swinhoe, 1861: Found in central and southern China, northern Vietnam
- S. s. cinereicapillus - R. Swinhoe, 1871: Originally described as a separate species. Found in Taiwan and Miyako and Yaeyama Islands of Japan
