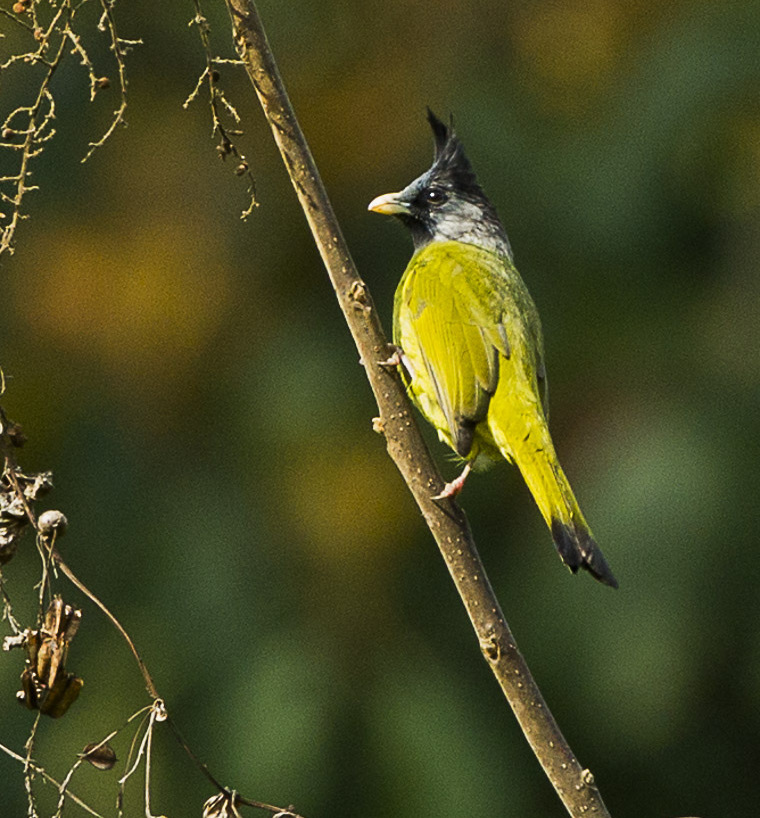
- In Thailand

Conservation status
- Least Concern (IUCN 3.1)

Scientific classification
- Kingdom: Animalia
- Phylum: Chordata
- Class: Aves
- Order: Passeriformes
- Family: Pycnonotidae
- Genus: Spizixos
- Species: S. canifrons

Binomial name
- Spizixos canifrons Blyth, 1845
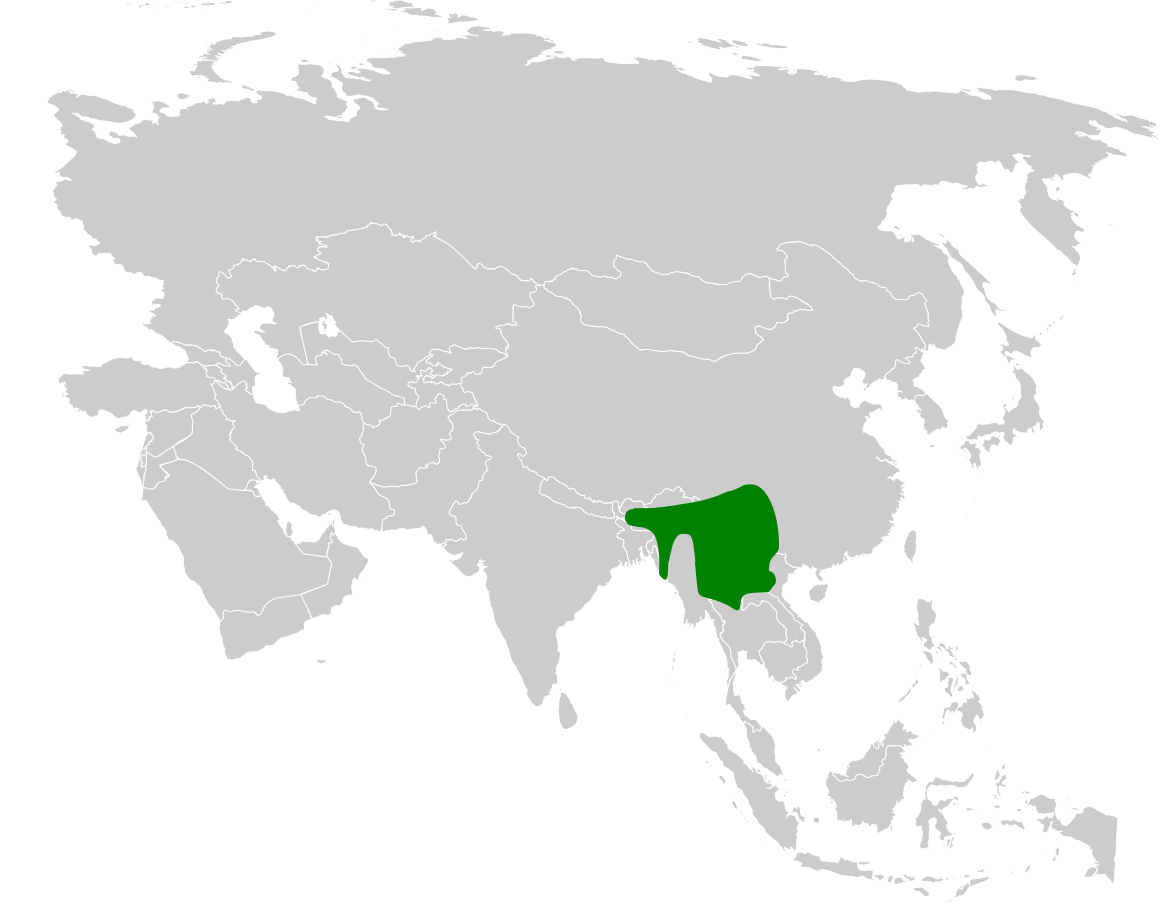

= Crested finchbill =

Species of songbird

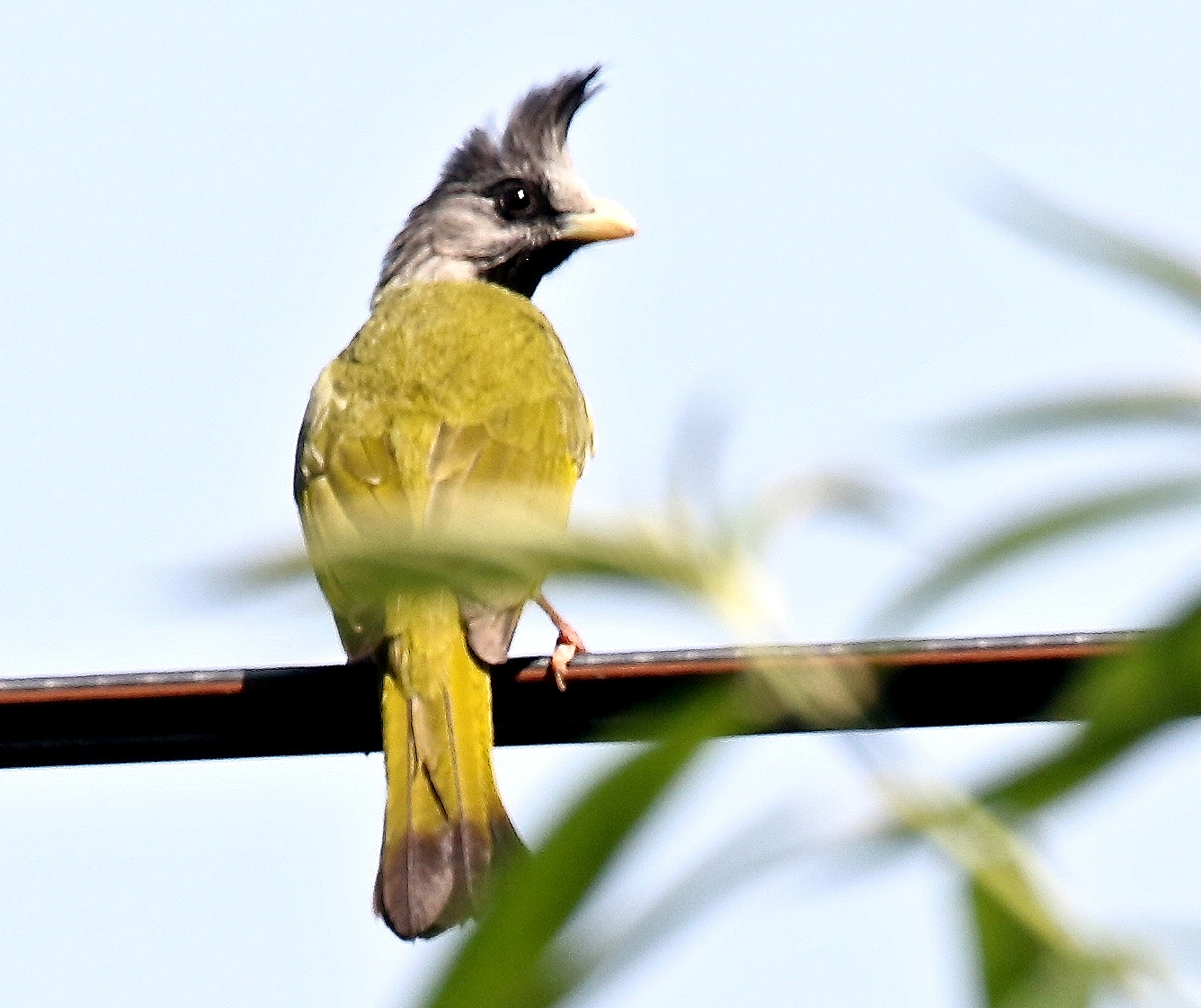
Doi Ang Khang Mountain - Thailand

The crested finchbill (Spizixos canifrons) is a species of songbird in the bulbul family, Pycnonotidae. It is found in south-eastern Asia from China and India to Indochina.

== Taxonomy ==
The crested finchbill was formally described in 1845 by the English zoologist Edward Blyth under the binomial name Spizixos canifrons. He specified the type locality as Cherrapunji in the Indian state of Meghalaya of northeast India. The specific epithet combines the Latin canus meaning "grey" with frons meaning "forehead".

=== Subspecies ===
Two subspecies are recognized:

- S. c. canifrons Blyth, 1845 – Found in north-eastern India and western Myanmar
- S. c. ingrami Bangs & Phillips, JC, 1914 – Found in eastern Myanmar, southern China and northern Indochina
