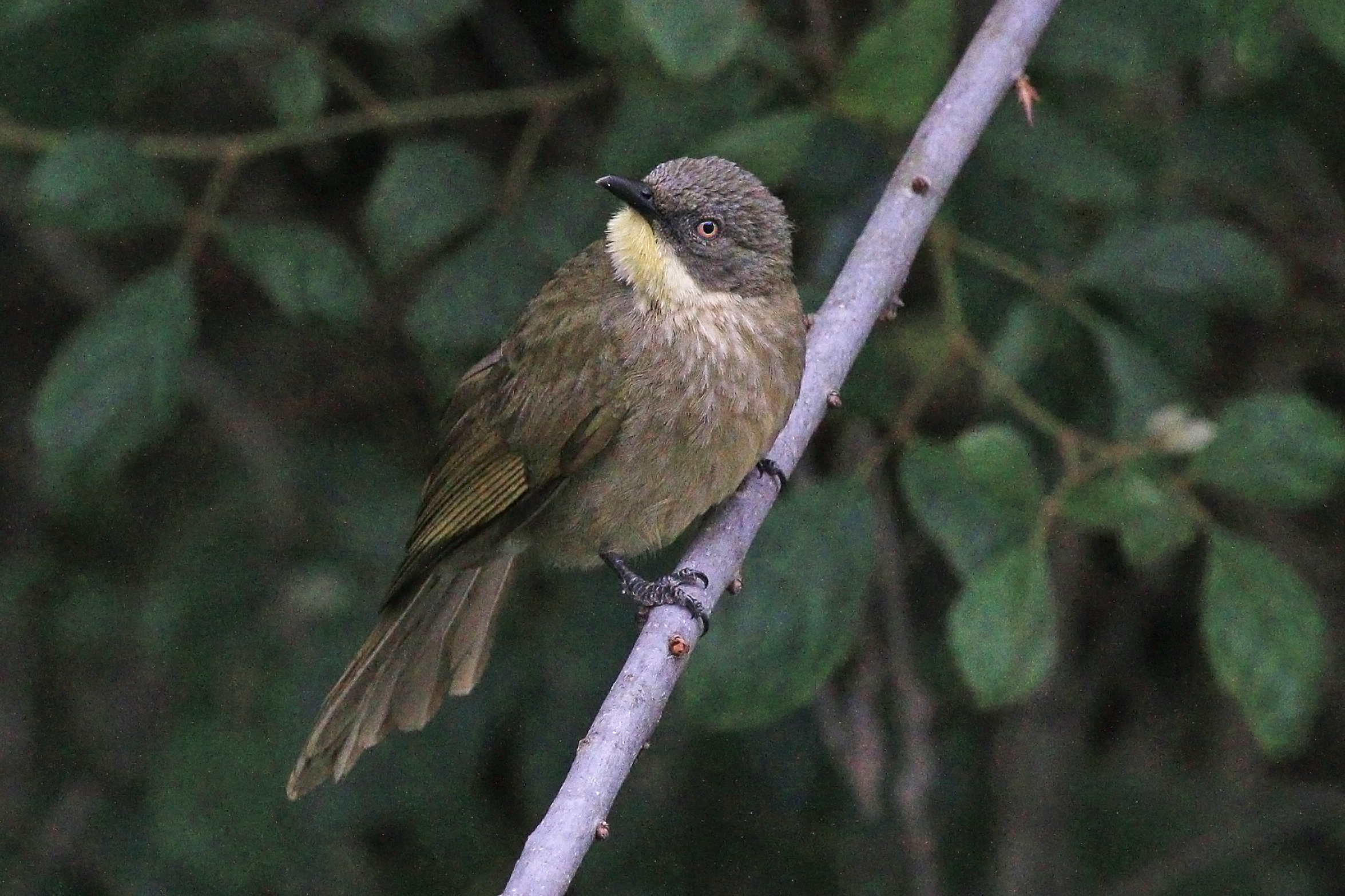
- Lake Bunyonyi, Uganda

Conservation status
- Least Concern (IUCN 3.1)

Scientific classification
- Kingdom: Animalia
- Phylum: Chordata
- Class: Aves
- Order: Passeriformes
- Family: Pycnonotidae
- Genus: Atimastillas
- Species: A. flavigula

Binomial name
- Atimastillas flavigula (Cabanis, 1880)

= Pale-throated greenbul =

Species of bird

The pale-throated greenbul (Atimastillas flavigula) is a species of passerine bird in the bulbul family Pycnonotidae. It is found in western central Africa. Its natural habitats are subtropical or tropical dry forests, moist savanna, and subtropical or tropical moist shrubland.

== Taxonomy ==
The pale-throated greenbul was formally described in 1880 by the German ornithologist Jean Cabanis based on a specimen collected in Angola. He coined the binomial name Trichophorus flavigula. The specific epithet combines Latin flavus meaning "golden-yellow" with gula meaning "throat". This species is now placed with the yellow-gorgeted greenbul in the genus Atimastillas that was introduced in 1905 by the American ornithologist Harry C. Oberholser. The pale-throated greenbul and the yellow-gorgeted greenbul was formerly considered to be conspecific. They were split based on the differences in morphology and vocalization.

Two subspecies are recognised:

- A. f. soror (Neumann, 1914) – central Cameroon to central west Ethiopia and central DR Congo
- A. f. flavigula (Cabanis, 1880) – Angola, southeast DR Congo to Uganda, west Kenya and west Tanzania
