= Yellow-gorgeted greenbul =

Conservation status
- Least Concern (IUCN 3.1)

Scientific classification
- Kingdom: Animalia
- Phylum: Chordata
- Class: Aves
- Order: Passeriformes
- Family: Pycnonotidae
- Genus: Atimastillas
- Species: A. flavicollis

Binomial name
- Atimastillas flavicollis (Swainson, 1837)

Synonyms
- Chlorocichla flavicollis; Criniger flavicollis; Haematornis flavicollis (protonym); Ixus flavicollis; Pycnonotus flavicollis; Trichophorus flavicollis; Xenocichla flavicollis

Species of bird

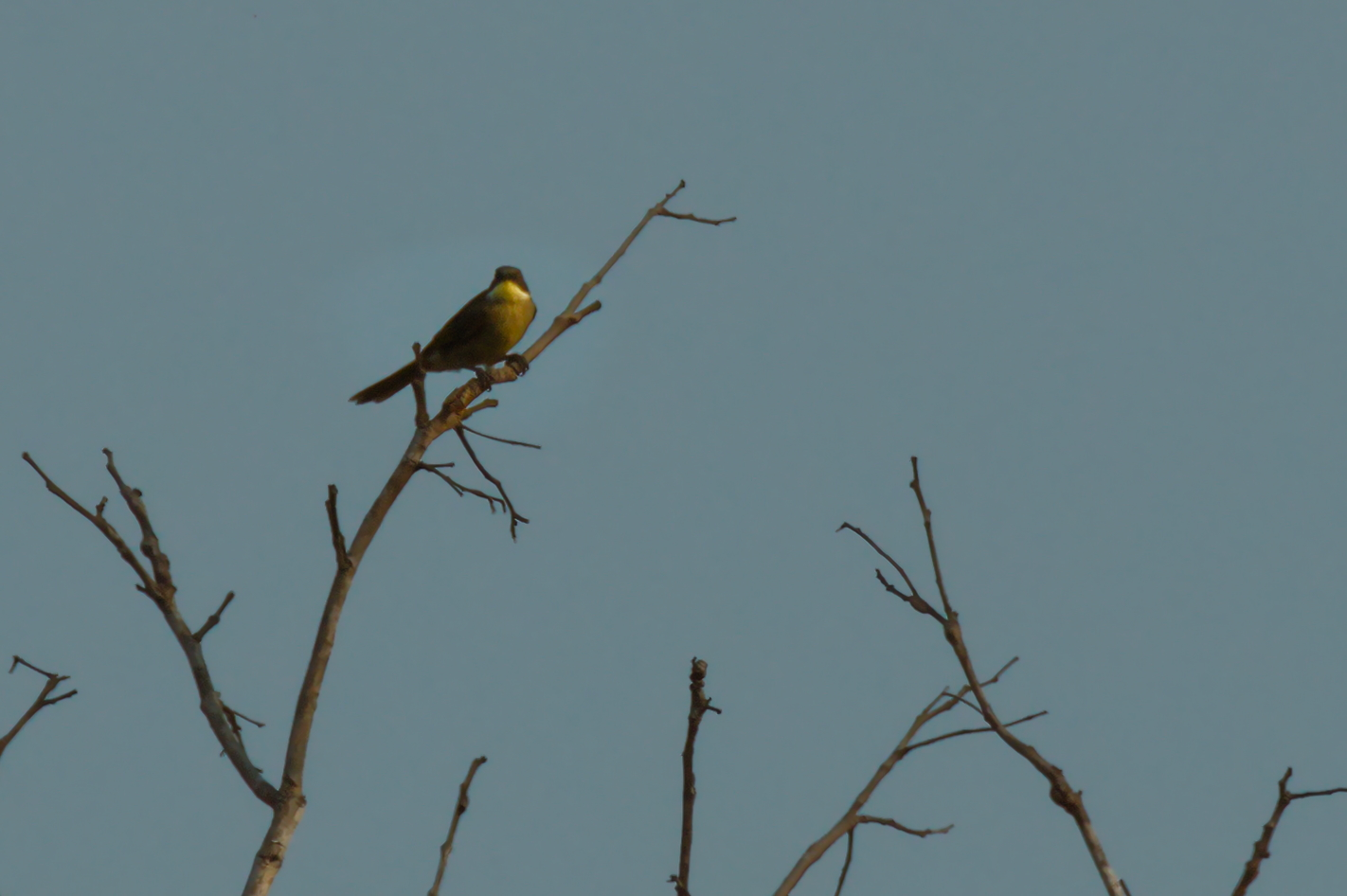
Yellow-gorgeted greenbul

The yellow-gorgeted greenbul (Atimastillas flavicollis), formerly known as the yellow-throated leaflove, is a species of passerine bird in the bulbul family Pycnonotidae. It is found in West Africa. Its natural habitats are subtropical or tropical dry forests, moist savanna, and subtropical or tropical moist shrubland.

== Taxonomy and systematics ==
The yellow-gorgeted greenbul was originally described in the genus Haematornis (a synonym for Pycnonotus) and later classified within Chlorocichla before being moved to the genus Atimastillas in 2010. Not all authorities have adopted this latest genus change. Formerly, various authorities have classified the yellow-gorgeted greenbul in several other genera, including Criniger, Ixus and Xenocichla (a synonym for Bleda). Alternatively, some authorities have classified the yellow-gorgeted greenbul as synonymous with the yellow-throated greenbul. Alternate names for the yellow-gorgeted greenbul include the mango bulbul, yellowthroat and yellow-throated greenbul. The alternate name 'yellowthroat' is not to be confused with the species of the genus Geothlypis.

The species is monotypic: no subspecies are recognised. It was formerly considered to be conspecific with the pale-throated greenbul (Atimastillas flavigula).
