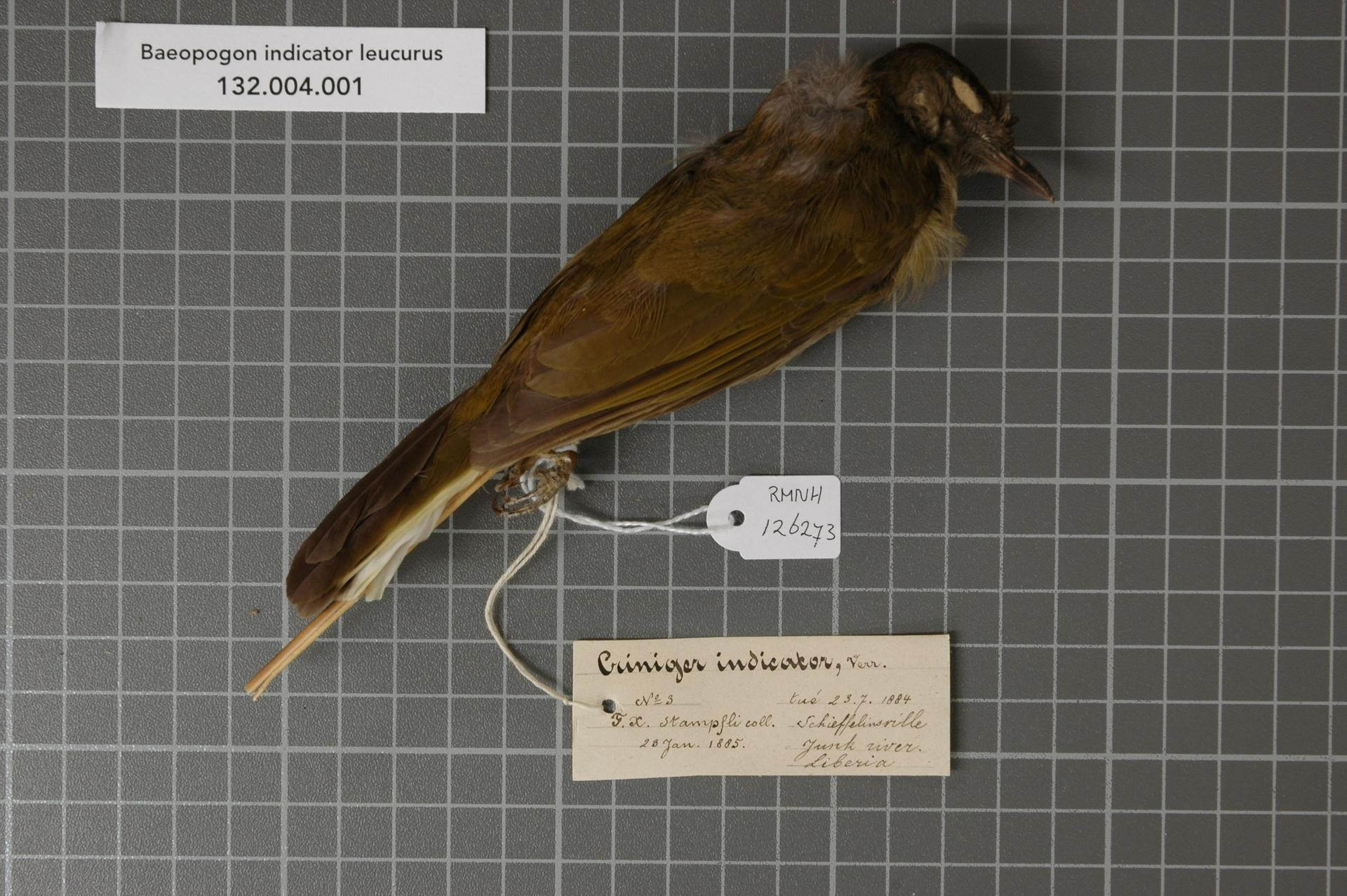

Scientific classification
- Kingdom: Animalia
- Phylum: Chordata
- Class: Aves
- Order: Passeriformes
- Family: Pycnonotidae
- Genus: Baeopogon; Heine, 1860

Type species
- Criniger indicator (Honeyguide greenbul) Verreaux, J & Verreaux, E, 1855
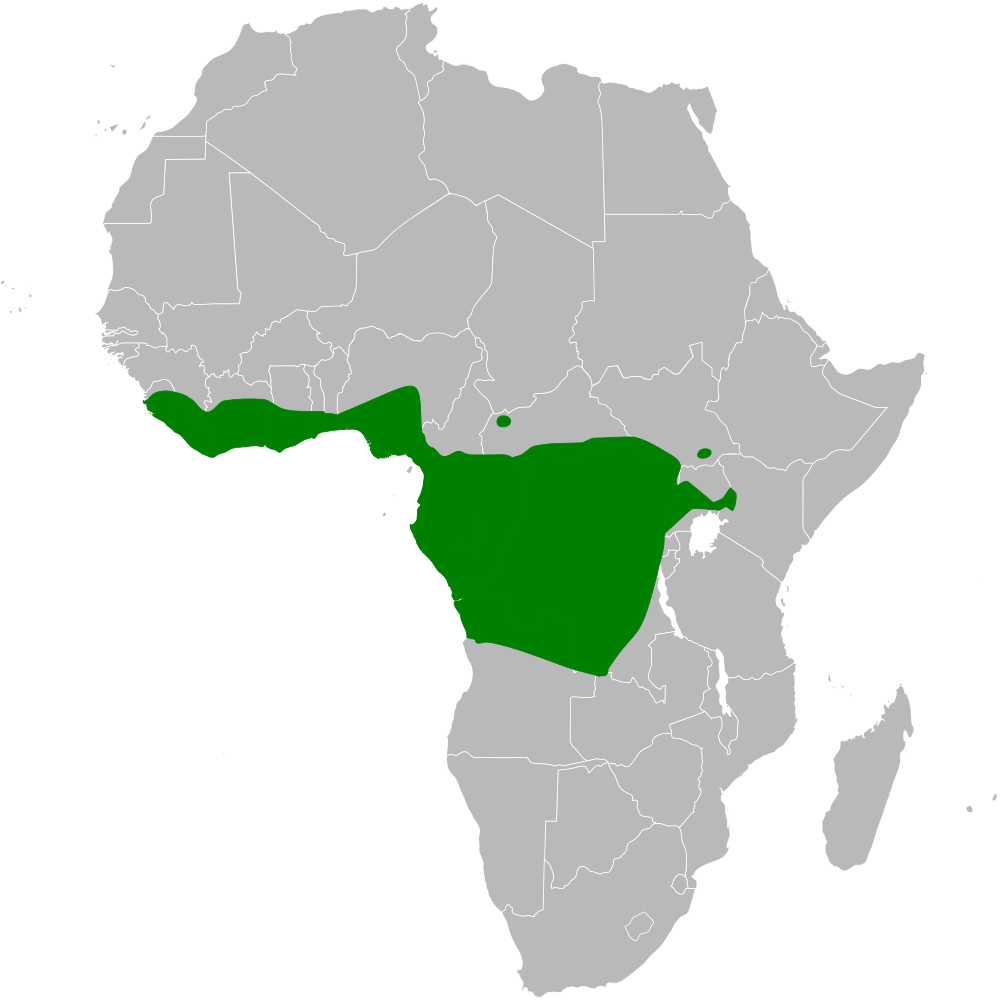

= Baeopogon =

Genus of birds

Baeopogon is a genus of passerine birds in the bulbul family, Pycnonotidae.

== Taxonomy ==
The genus Baeopogon was introduced in 1860 by the German ornithologist Ferdinand Heine with the honeyguide greenbul as the type species. The name combines the Ancient Greek baios (βαιός) meaning "small" or "little" with pōgōn meaning "beard".

The genus contains the following two species:

| Image | Common name | Scientific name | Distribution |
|---|---|---|---|
| | Honeyguide greenbul | Baeopogon indicator | Widespread throughout the African tropical rainforest. |
| | Sjöstedt's greenbul | Baeopogon clamans | Southeastern Nigeria and western Cameroon to Central African Republic and extreme northwestern Angola; central and eastern Democratic Republic of the Congo. |
