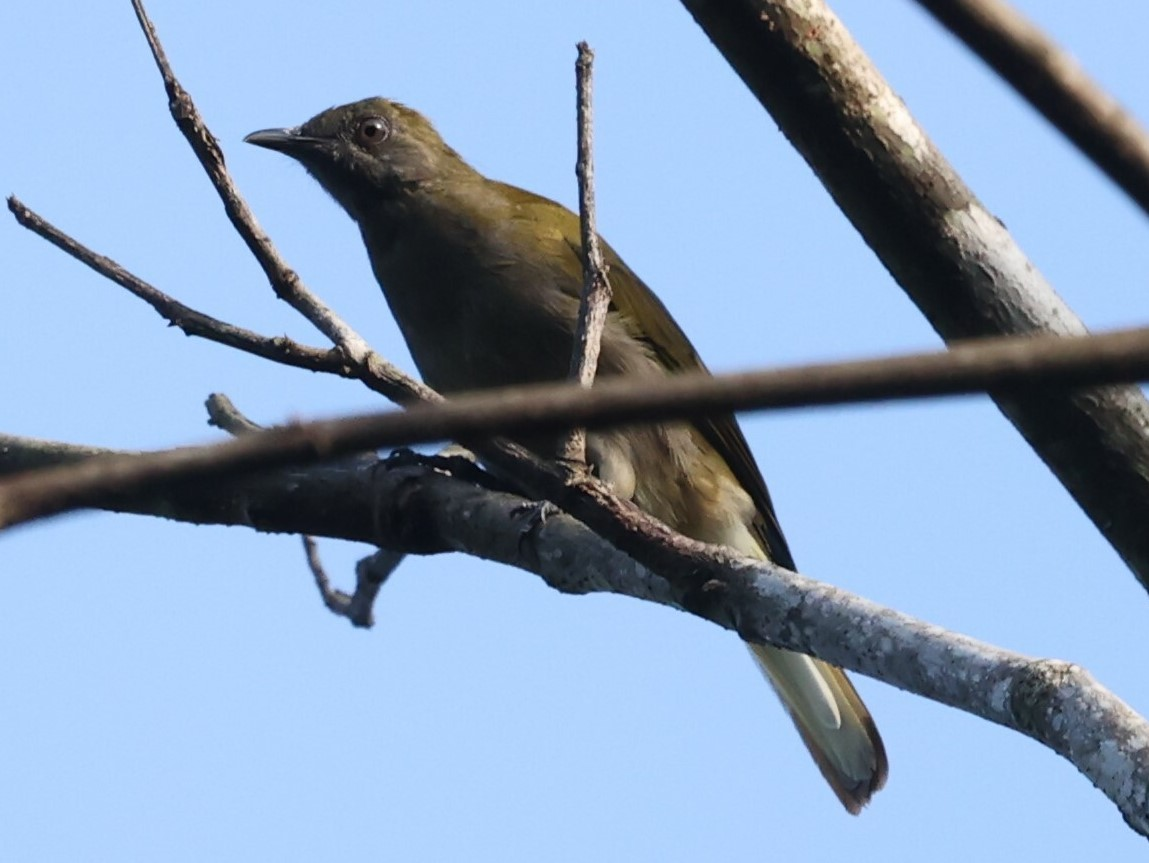
- Immature

Conservation status
- Least Concern (IUCN 3.1)

Scientific classification
- Kingdom: Animalia
- Phylum: Chordata
- Class: Aves
- Order: Passeriformes
- Family: Pycnonotidae
- Genus: Baeopogon
- Species: B. indicator

Binomial name
- Baeopogon indicator (Verreaux, J & Verreaux, É, 1855)
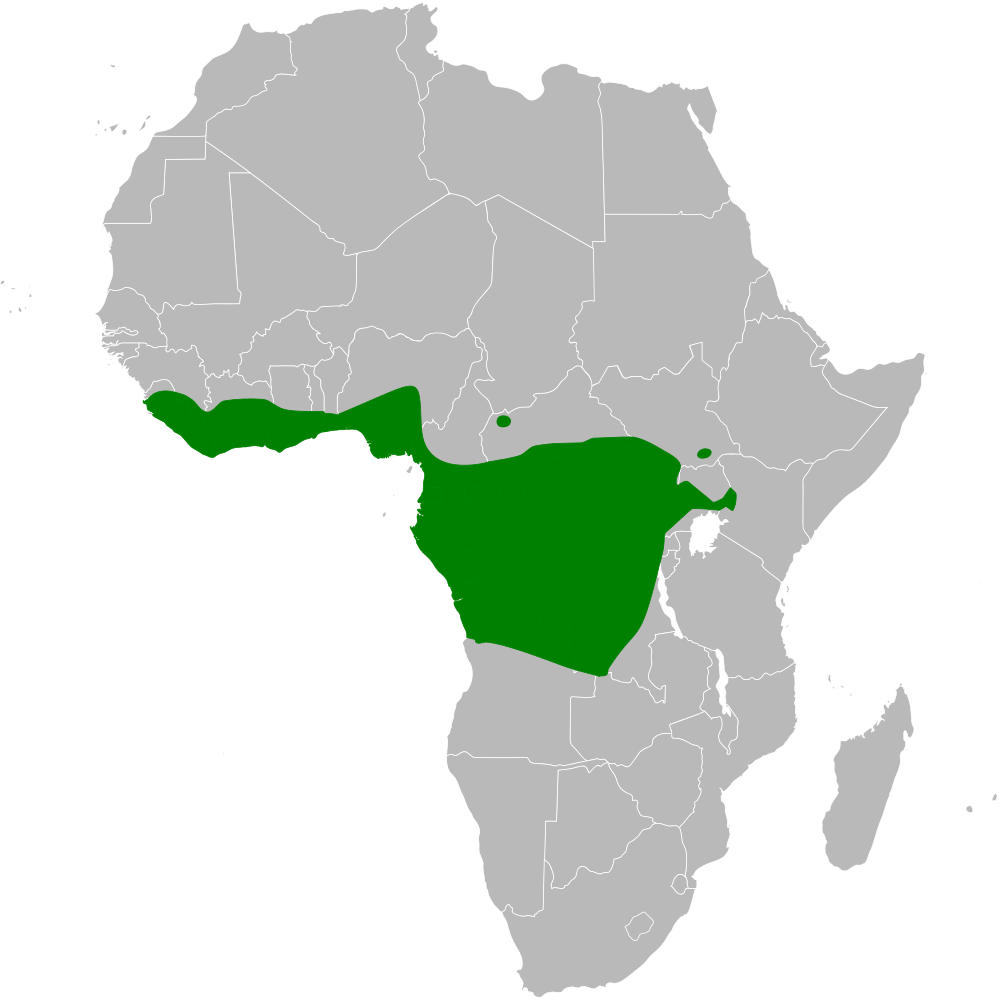

Synonyms
- Baeopogon batesi; Criniger indicator

= Honeyguide greenbul =

Species of bird

The honeyguide greenbul (Baeopogon indicator) is a species of songbird in the bulbul family, Pycnonotidae. It is widespread throughout the African tropical rainforest.

== Taxonomy and systematics ==
The honeyguide greenbul was originally described in the genus Criniger and was later re-classified to the genus Baeopogon. Alternate names for the honeyguide greenbul include the honeyguide bulbul and white-tailed greenbul. The latter name is also used as an alternate name by Sjöstedt's greenbul and the swamp palm bulbul.

=== Subspecies ===
Two subspecies of the honeyguide greenbul are recognized:

- Upper Guinea honeyguide greenbul (B. i. leucurus) - (Cassin, 1855): Originally described as a separate species in the genus Trichophorus (a synonym for Criniger). Found from Sierra Leone to Togo
- Uganda honeyguide greenbul (B. i. indicator) - (Verreaux, J & Verreaux, E, 1855): Found from Nigeria to southern Sudan and western Kenya, southern Democratic Republic of the Congo, north-western Zambia and northern Angola
