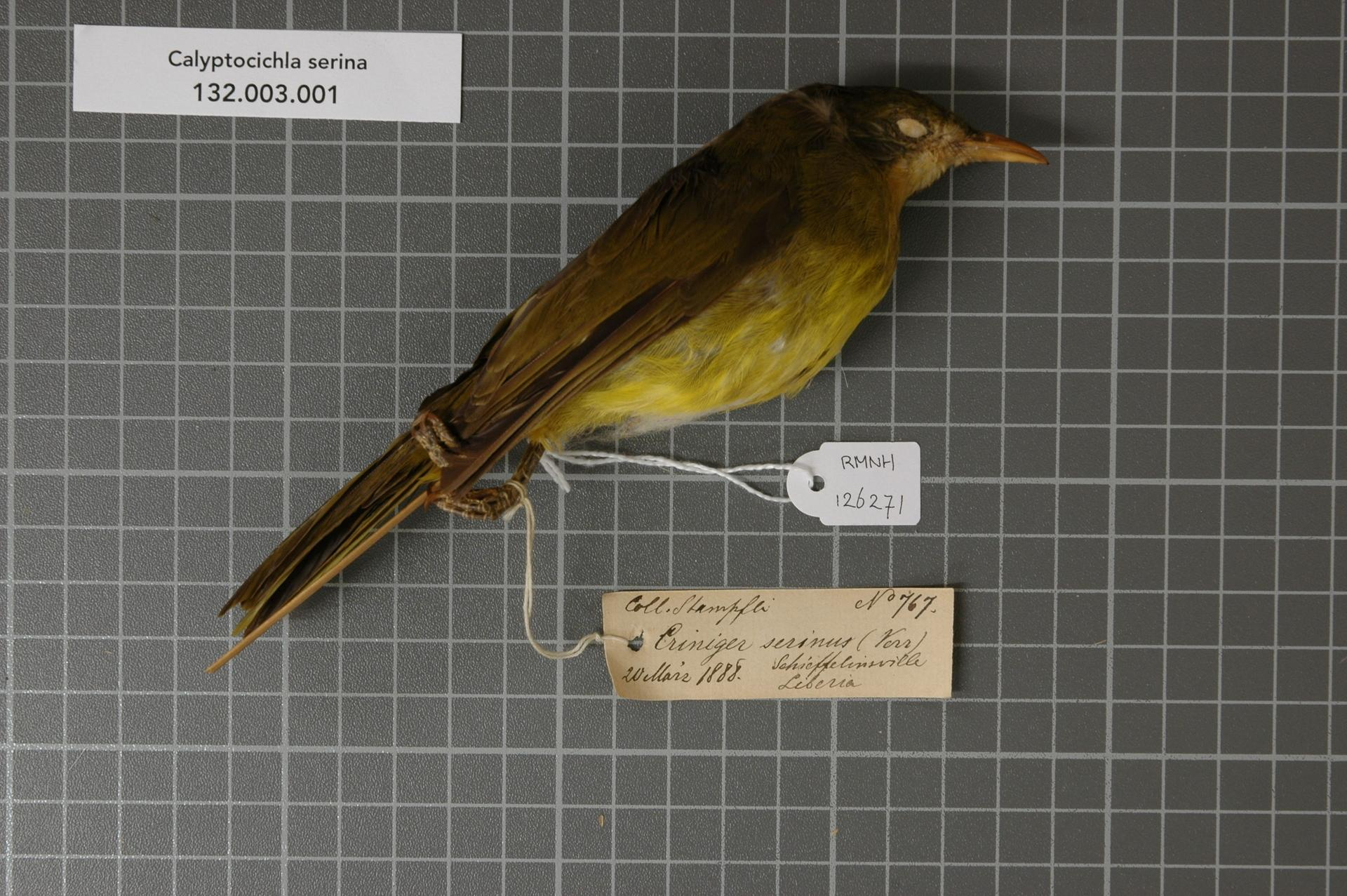

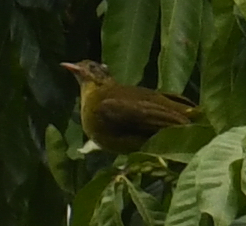

Conservation status
- Least Concern (IUCN 3.1)

Scientific classification
- Kingdom: Animalia
- Phylum: Chordata
- Class: Aves
- Order: Passeriformes
- Family: Pycnonotidae
- Genus: Calyptocichla; Oberholser, 1905
- Species: C. serinus

Binomial name
- Calyptocichla serinus (Verreaux, J & Verreaux, É, 1855)
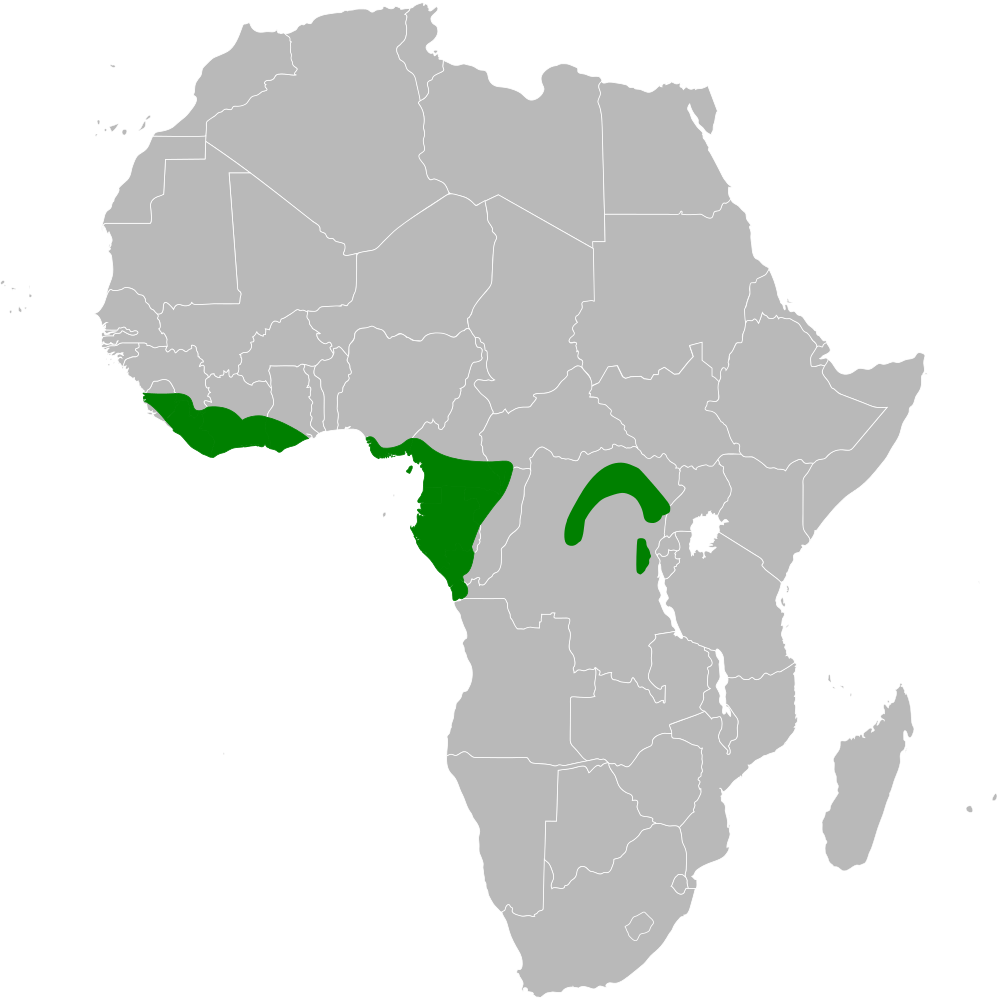

Synonyms
- (Genus): Trichites; (Species): Calyptocichla serina; Criniger serinus

= Golden greenbul =

Species of bird

The golden greenbul (Calyptocichla serinus) is a member of the bulbul family of passerine birds native to the African tropical rainforest. It is the only member of the genus Calyptocichla.

== Taxonomy and systematics ==
The golden greenbul was originally described in the genus Criniger. It is not closely related to any of the other greenbul species, forming a separate clade from the two main clades which make up the bulbul family Pycnonotidae. Alternate names for the golden greenbul include the serene bulbul and serene greenbul.

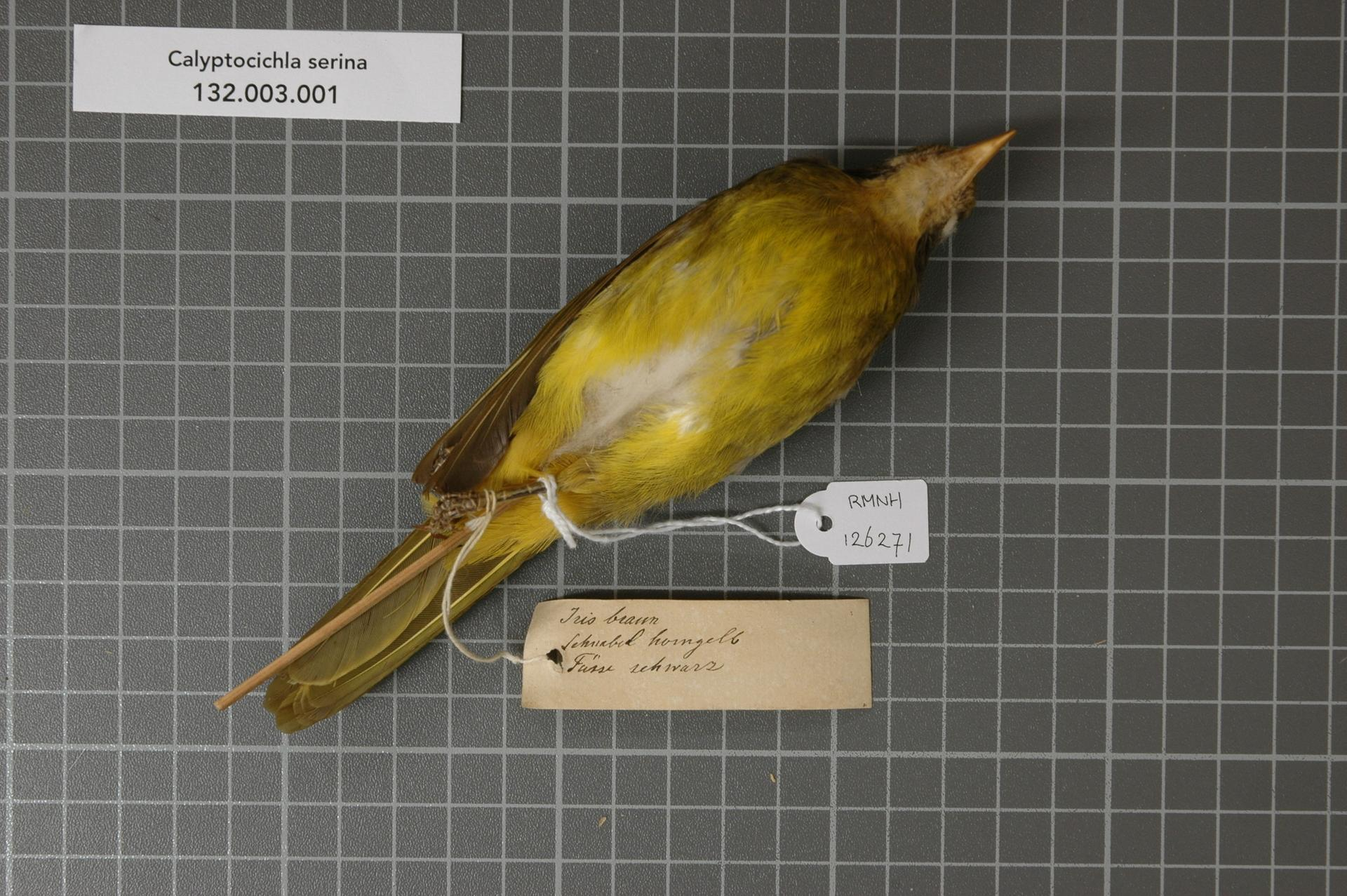
Same museum specimen as top right, now belly up, Naturalis

== Description ==
The golden greenbul is brightly coloured for a greenbul due to its bright yellow belly and white throat; otherwise it is not particularly distinct in plumage, with unmarked olive upperparts, tail and wings. It has a long slender pinkish-brown bill, a feature not shared by other greenbuls.

== Distribution and habitat ==
The species is found in forests from Sierra Leone to Ghana; south-eastern Nigeria and western Cameroon to Central African Republic and extreme north-western Angola.
