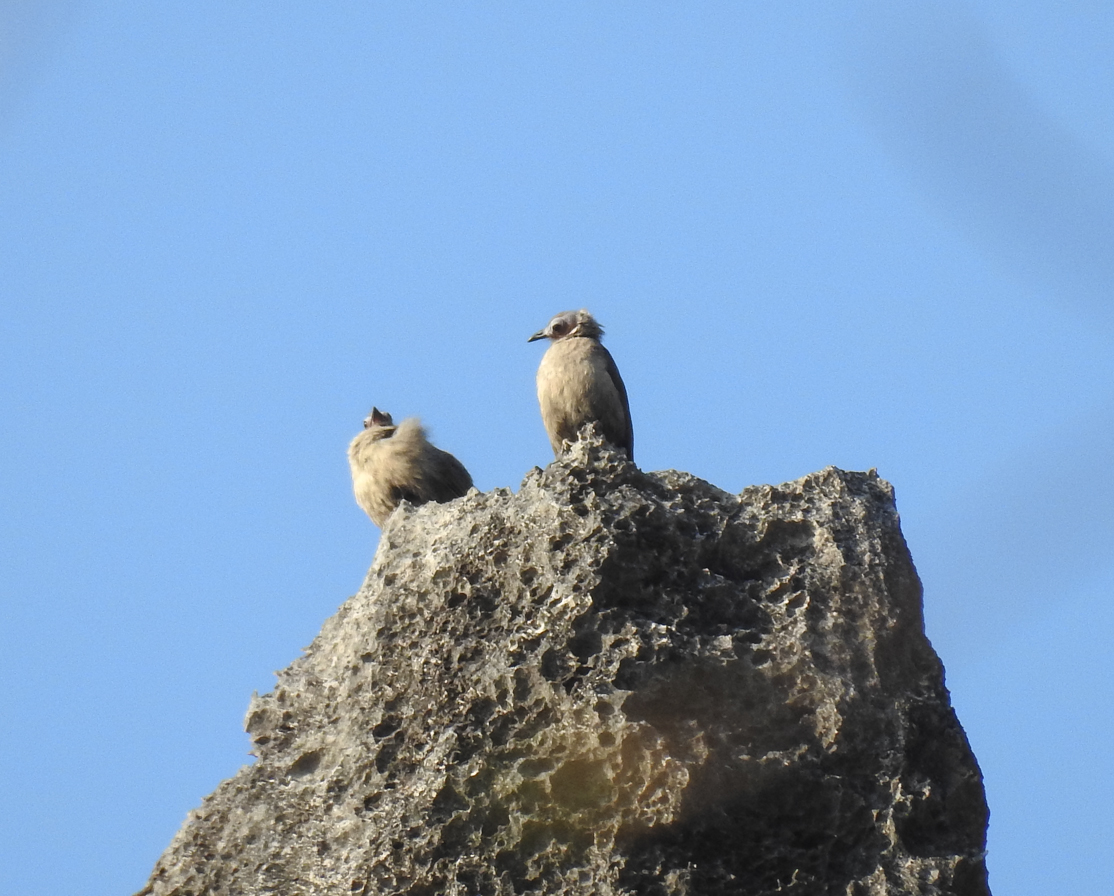
- Bare-faced bulbuls in Na Hin National Park, Laos

Conservation status
- Least Concern (IUCN 3.1)

Scientific classification
- Kingdom: Animalia
- Phylum: Chordata
- Class: Aves
- Order: Passeriformes
- Family: Pycnonotidae
- Genus: Nok; Fuchs et al., 2018
- Species: N. hualon

Binomial name
- Nok hualon (Woxvold, Duckworth & Timmins, 2009)
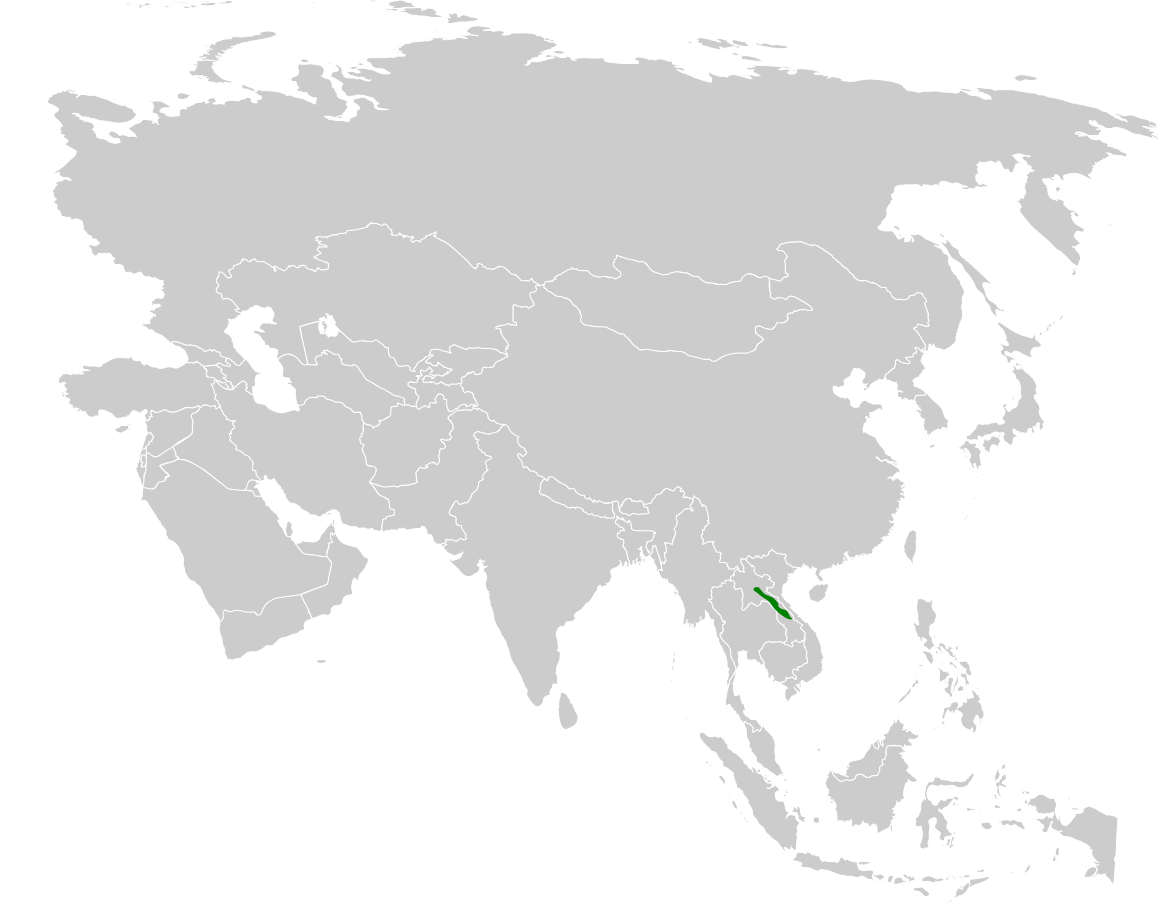

Synonyms
- Pycnonotus hualon

= Bare-faced bulbul =

Species of bird

The bare-faced bulbul (Nok hualon) is a member of the bulbul family of passerine birds. It was newly described from central Laos in 2009. It is one of the very few Asian songbirds with a bald (featherless) face and is the first new species of bulbul to be described from Asia in almost a century.

== Taxonomy and systematics ==
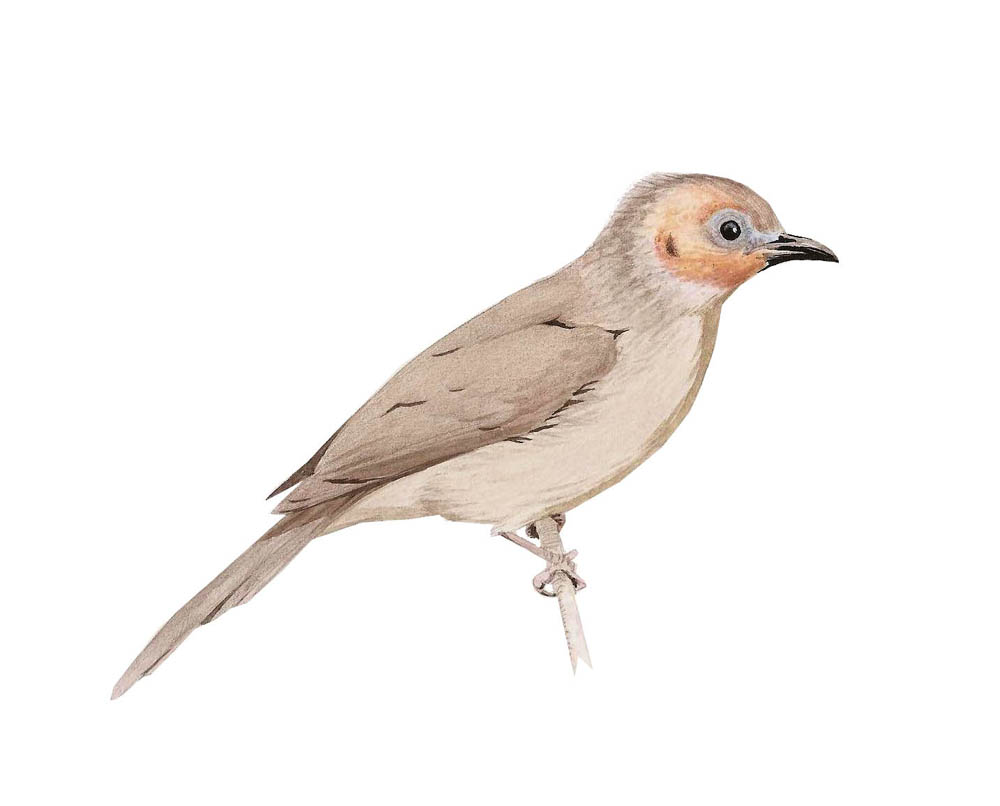
A sketch of bare-faced bulbul

The species epithet hualon is from the Lao word for "bald-headed". A 2018 molecular phylogenetic study of the bulbuls suggested that the species does not fit in the clade containing the core Pycnonotus and stood apart suggesting its placement in a new genus Nok from Lao language for "bird" as Nok hualon.

== Description ==
The mainly olive-green bare-faced bulbul is distinctive in having a bare pink face with blueish skin around the eyes. The two specimens so far collected were around 20 cm in length and weighed 32-40 g. The breast and belly are fawn-grey, the uppersides olive and the throat is off-white. According to researchers, its call is a "dry bubbly tweet".

== Habitat ==
The bare-faced bulbul is known only from the limestone karst region near Pha Lom in central Laos. The area is characterised by steep terrain with bare limestone and low (less than 4 m in height) deciduous trees and shrubs. It seems likely that the species is restricted entirely to this habitat, though it may occur at other sites in Laos with similar habitats. Observations of similar birds were made in 1995 at another site. Limestone karst is the habitat of several newly discovered endemic species, including the unusual Laotian rock rat.

== Behaviour ==
The bare-faced bulbul is mainly arboreal but sometimes perches on rocks on the steep hillsides. It is a conspicuous species, foraging during the day in pairs or as singles. Single birds tend to call regularly, and will link up with another before flying to a new area to forage. They have not been observed to join mixed-species feeding flocks. The breeding behaviour of this species has not yet been observed.

== Status and conservation ==
The bare-faced bulbul was assessed for the first time in 2010 by BirdLife International as of Least Concern, on the basis that the species has a large range, and there is insufficient evidence on population trend and size. In the paper describing the species it was suggested that it be listed as data deficient until further surveys of likely habitat were undertaken. The limestone karst in which it lives is threatened by quarrying and habitat degradation caused by overgrazing.
