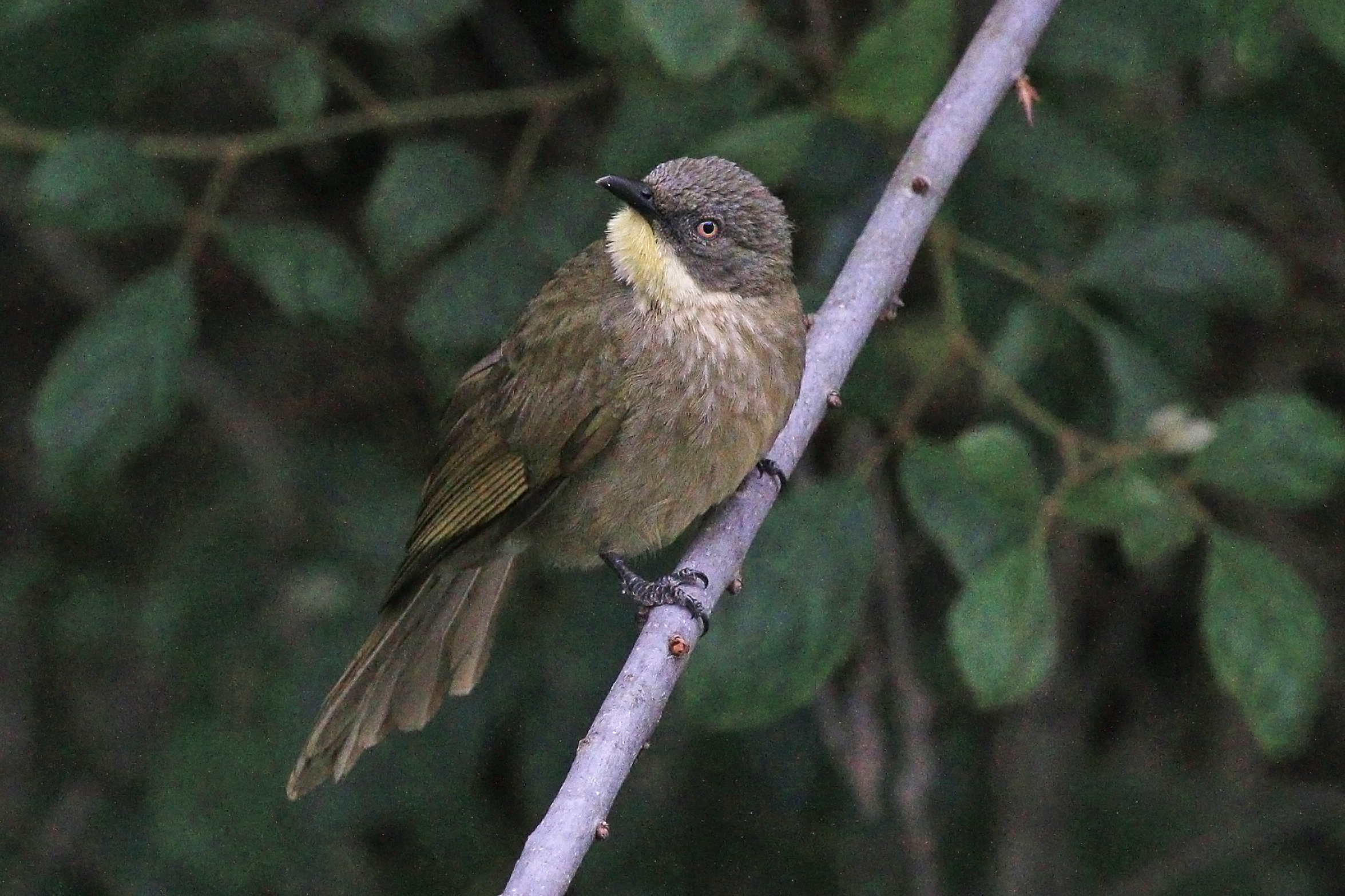
- Pale-throated greenbul (Atimastillas flavigula)

Scientific classification
- Kingdom: Animalia
- Phylum: Chordata
- Class: Aves
- Order: Passeriformes
- Family: Pycnonotidae
- Genus: Atimastillas; Oberholser, 1905

Type species
- Heamatornis flavicollis (Yellow-gorgeted greenbul) Swainson, 1837

= Atimastillas =

Genus of birds

Atimastillas is a genus of passerine birds in the bulbul family, Pycnonotidae. They are found in wooded areas of tropical Africa.

== Taxonomy ==
The genus Atimastillas was introduced in 1905 by the American ornithologist Harry C. Oberholser with Heamatornis flavicollis Swainson, the yellow-gorgeted greenbul, as the type species. The genus name combines the Ancient Greek ατιμαστος/atimastos meaning "disdained" with ιλλας/illas, ιλλαδοςillados meaning "thrush".

=== Species ===
The genus contains the following two species:

Image	Common name	Scientific name	Distribution
	Yellow-gorgeted greenbul	Atimastillas flavicollis	West Africa.
	Pale-throated greenbul	Atimastillas flavigula (split from A. flavicollis)	Western central Africa.
