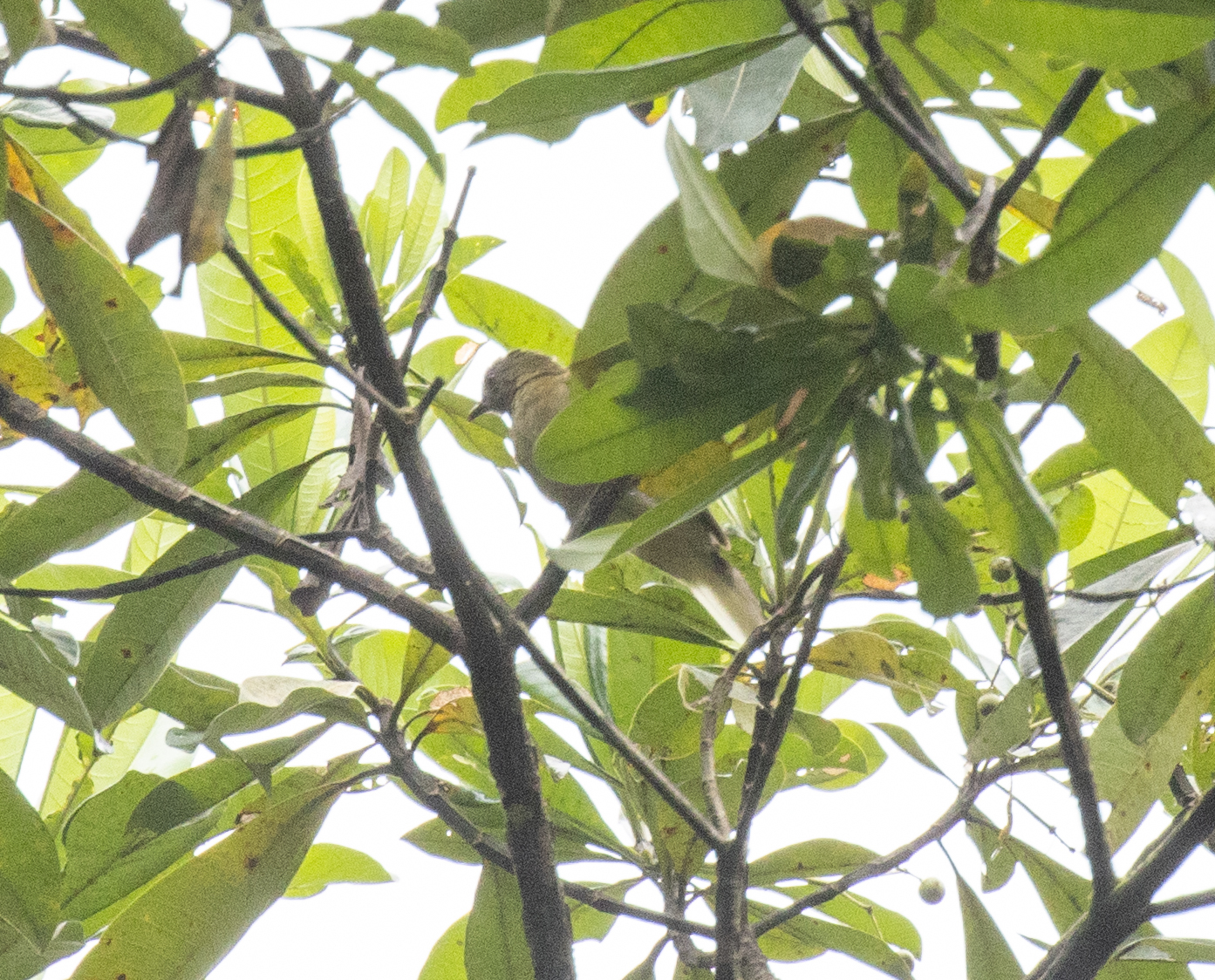

Conservation status
- Least Concern (IUCN 3.1)

Scientific classification
- Kingdom: Animalia
- Phylum: Chordata
- Class: Aves
- Order: Passeriformes
- Family: Pycnonotidae
- Genus: Baeopogon
- Species: B. clamans

Binomial name
- Baeopogon clamans (Sjöstedt, 1893)
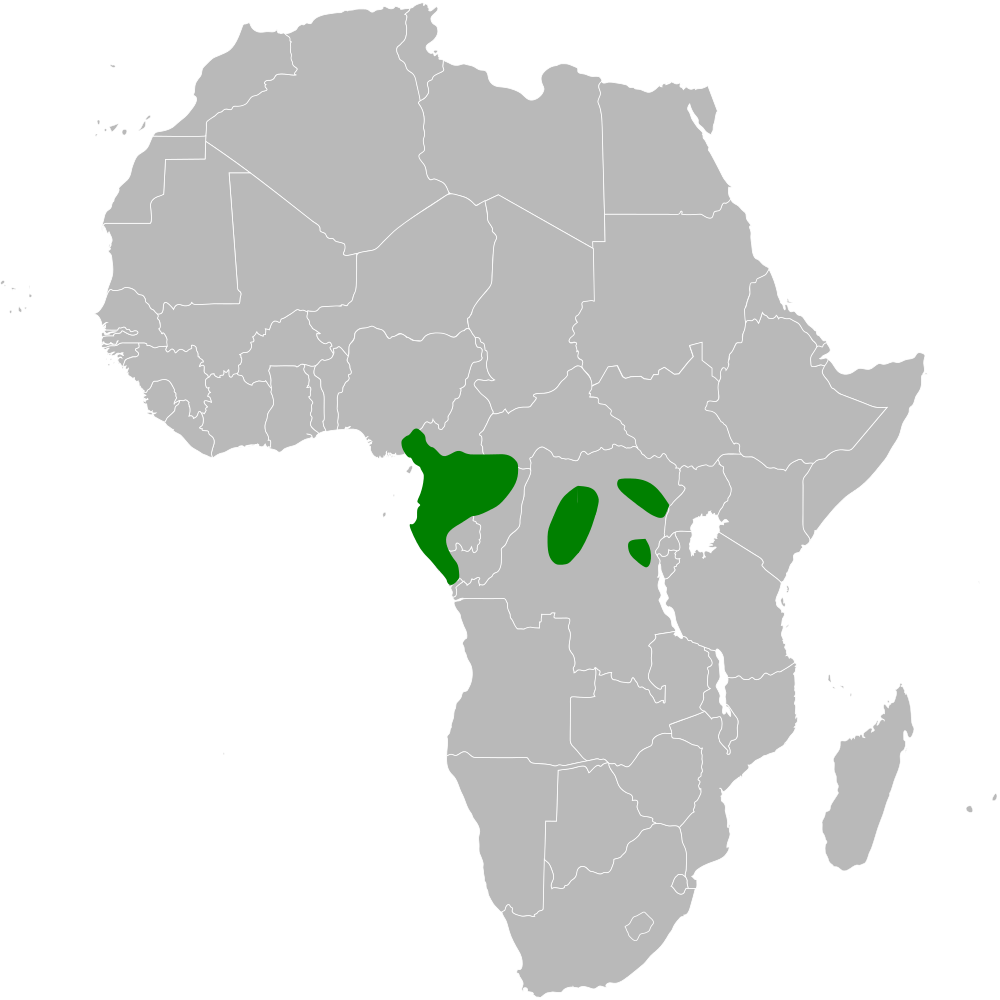

Synonyms
- Xenocichla clamans

= Sjöstedt's greenbul =

Species of songbird

Sjöstedt's greenbul (Baeopogon clamans) is a species of songbird in the bulbul family, Pycnonotidae. It is found in western and central Africa.

== Taxonomy and systematics ==
Sjöstedt's greenbul was originally described in the genus Xenocichla (a synonym for Bleda), then re-classified to Baeopogon. The common name commemorates the Swedish ornithologist Bror Yngve Sjöstedt. Alternate names for Sjöstedt's greenbul include Sjöstedt's bulbul, Sjöstedt's honeyguide bulbul, Sjöstedt's honeyguide greenbul, Sjöstedt's white-tailed greenbul and white-tailed greenbul. The latter alternate name is also used by the honeyguide greenbul and the swamp palm bulbul.

== Distribution and habitat ==
It is found from south-eastern Nigeria and western Cameroon to Central African Republic and extreme north-western Angola; central and eastern Democratic Republic of the Congo. Its natural habitat is subtropical or tropical moist lowland forests.
