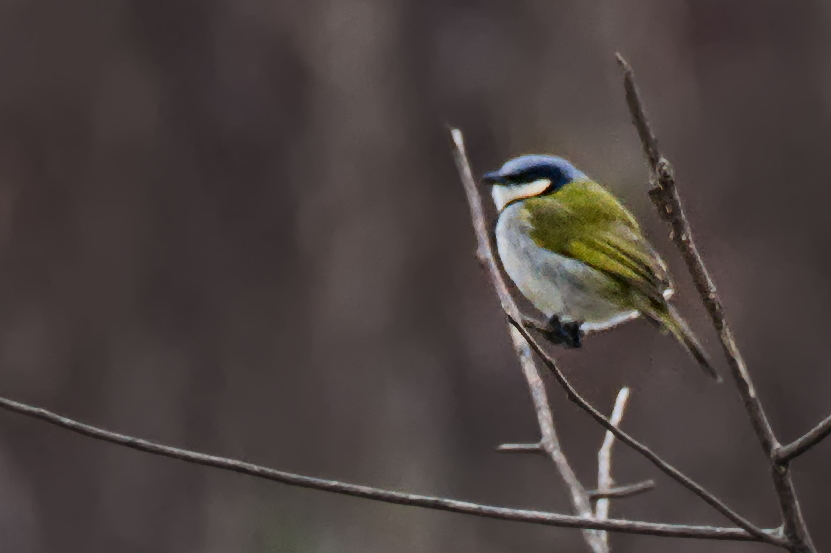

Conservation status
- Least Concern (IUCN 3.1)

Scientific classification
- Kingdom: Animalia
- Phylum: Chordata
- Class: Aves
- Order: Passeriformes
- Family: Pycnonotidae
- Genus: Neolestes; Cabanis, 1875
- Species: N. torquatus

Binomial name
- Neolestes torquatus Cabanis, 1875
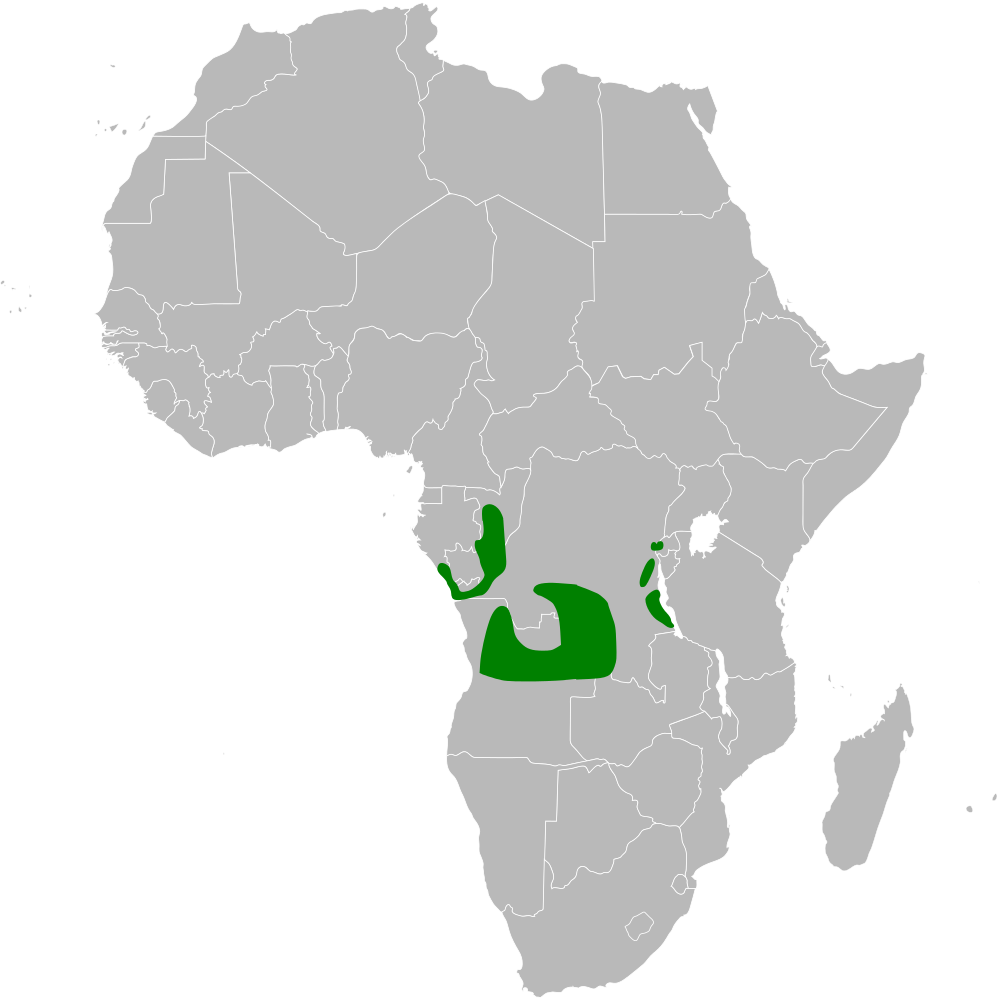

= Black-collared bulbul =

Species of bird

The black-collared bulbul (Neolestes torquatus), or black-collared greenbul, is a species of songbird in the bulbul family, Pycnonotidae. It is monotypic within the genus Neolestes. For many years, its genus was considered to belong to the bushshrike or shrike families due to morphological similarities until a review of molecular genetics in 1999 confirmed that it belongs to the family Pycnonotidae. The black-collared bulbul is found in equatorial Africa in its natural habitat of dry savanna and grassland.

== Conservation status ==
The black-collared bulbul was listed as Least Concern by a 2018 IUCN Red List assessment.
