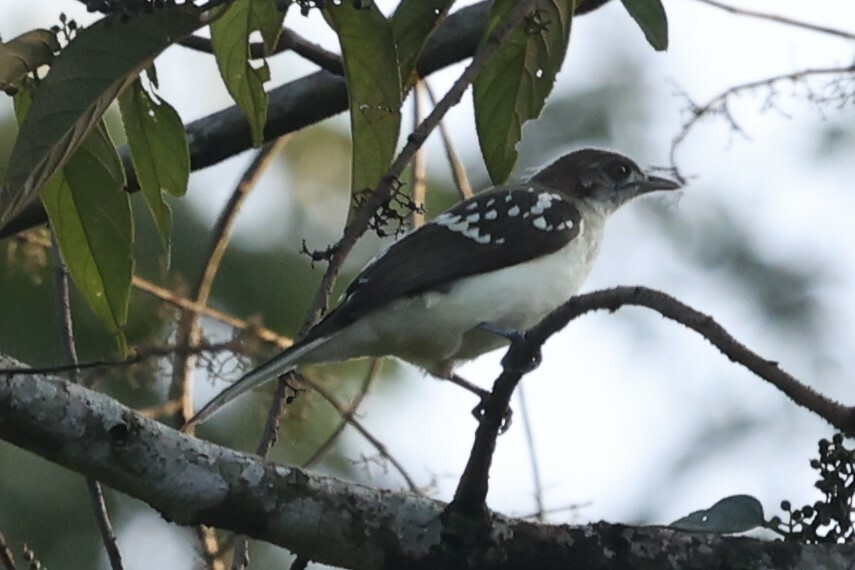

Conservation status
- Least Concern (IUCN 3.1)

Scientific classification
- Kingdom: Animalia
- Phylum: Chordata
- Class: Aves
- Order: Passeriformes
- Family: Pycnonotidae
- Genus: Ixonotus; Verreaux, J & Verreaux, É, 1851
- Species: I. guttatus

Binomial name
- Ixonotus guttatus Verreaux, J & Verreaux, É, 1851
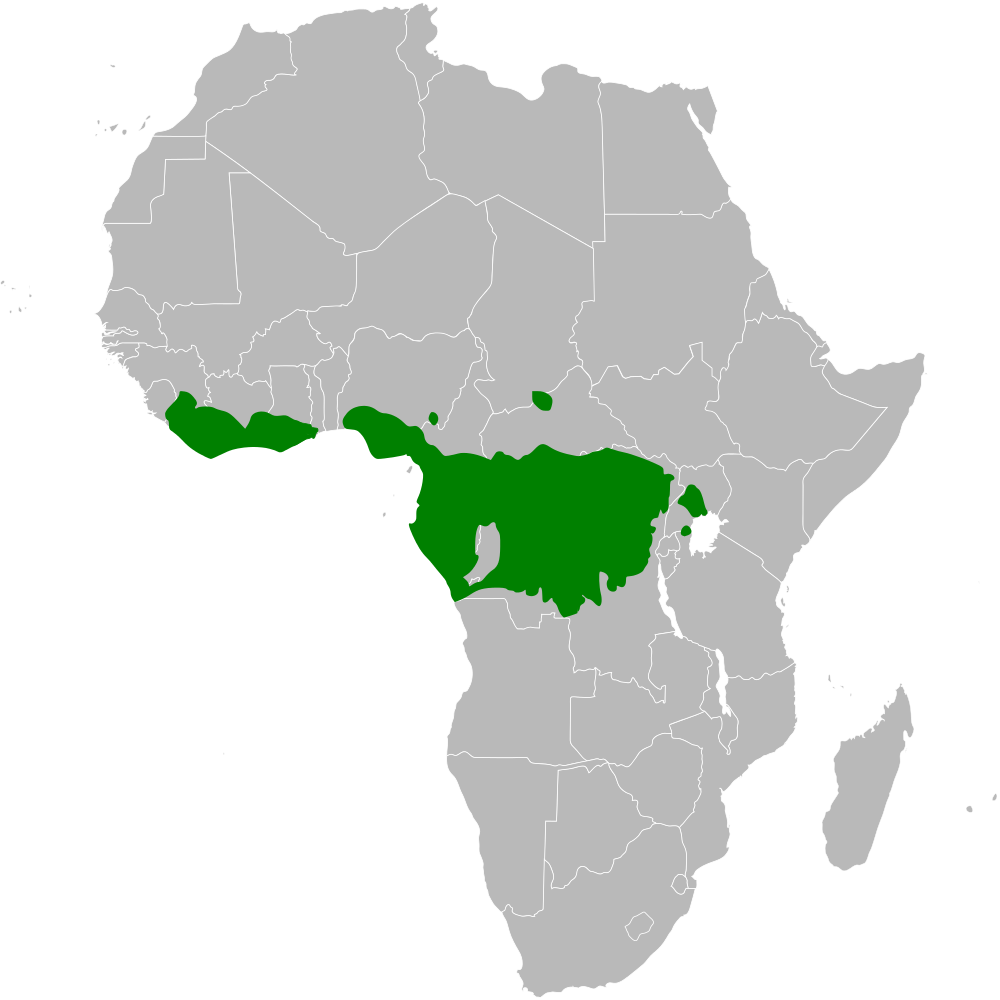

= Spotted greenbul =

Species of bird

The spotted greenbul (Ixonotus guttatus) or spotted bulbul, is a species of songbird in the bulbul family, Pycnonotidae. It is classified in the monotypic genus Ixonotus. It is widely spread throughout the African tropical rainforest, from Sierra Leone and Guinea to Ghana; southern Nigeria to Uganda, northern Tanzania, eastern and central Democratic Republic of the Congo and extreme north-western Angola. Its natural habitats are subtropical or tropical dry forest, subtropical or tropical moist lowland forest, and moist savanna.
