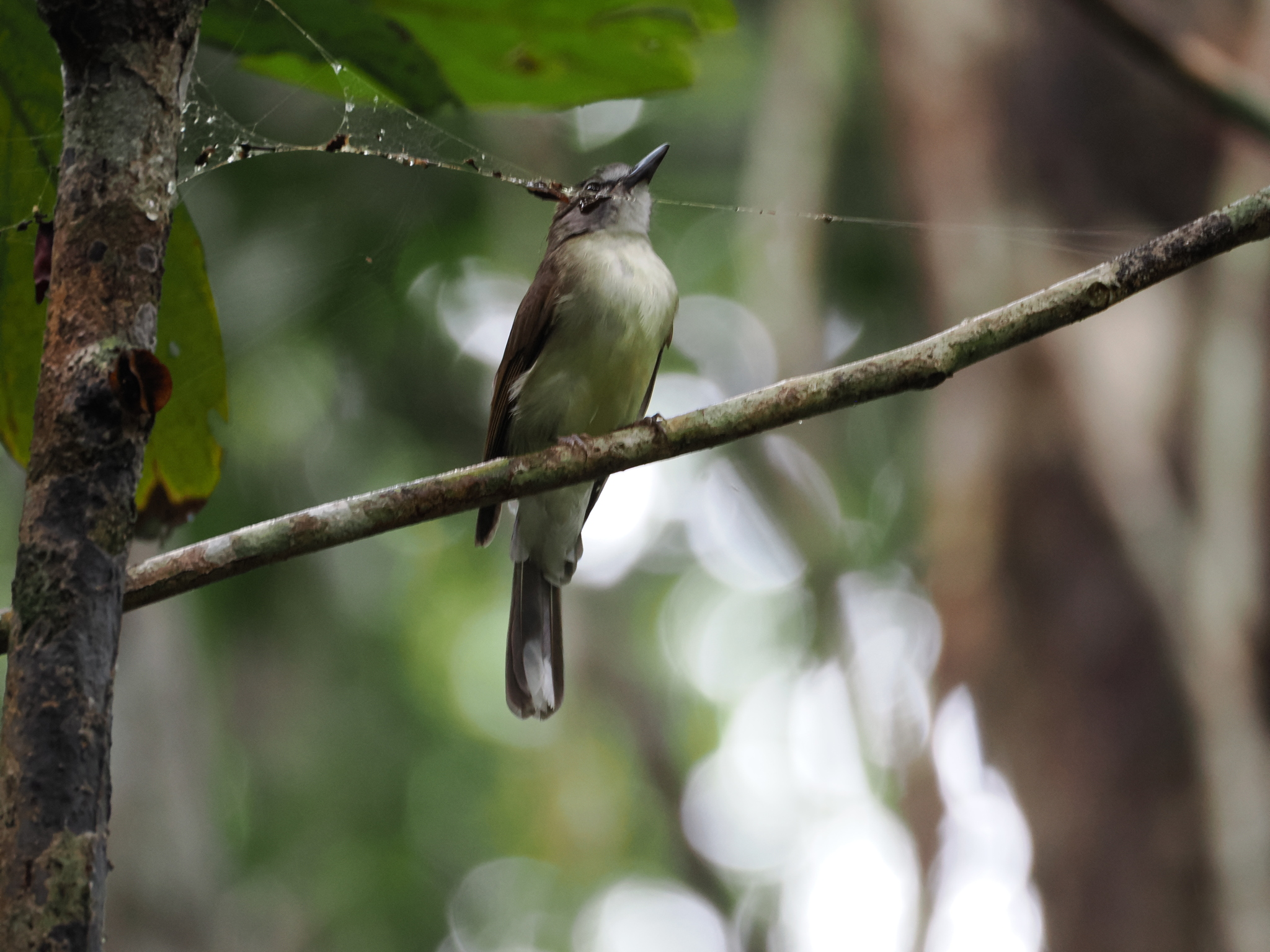

Conservation status
- Vulnerable (IUCN 3.1)

Scientific classification
- Kingdom: Animalia
- Phylum: Chordata
- Class: Aves
- Order: Passeriformes
- Family: Pycnonotidae
- Genus: Setornis; Lesson, 1839
- Species: S. criniger

Binomial name
- Setornis criniger Lesson, 1839
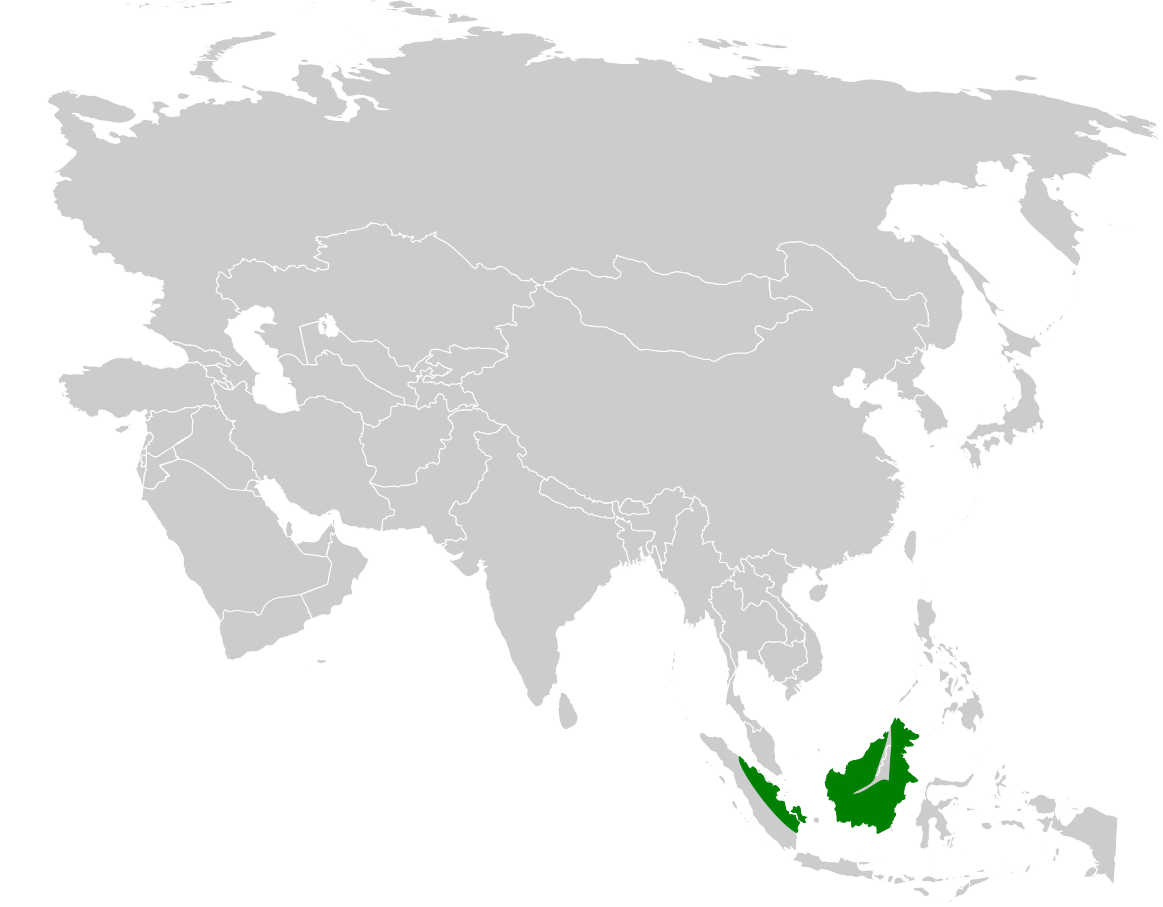

Synonyms
- (Genus): Trichophoropsis

= Hook-billed bulbul =

Species of bird

The hook-billed bulbul (Setornis criniger) is a species of songbird in the bulbul family, Pycnonotidae. It is found in eastern Sumatra and Borneo, where its natural habitats are subtropical or tropical moist lowland forest and subtropical or tropical swamps. It is threatened by habitat loss. Alternate names for the hook-billed bulbul include the long hook-billed bulbul and long-billed bulbul.

While currently monotypic within the genus Setornis, originally the genus contained the hairy-backed bulbul (now Tricholestes criniger viridis).
