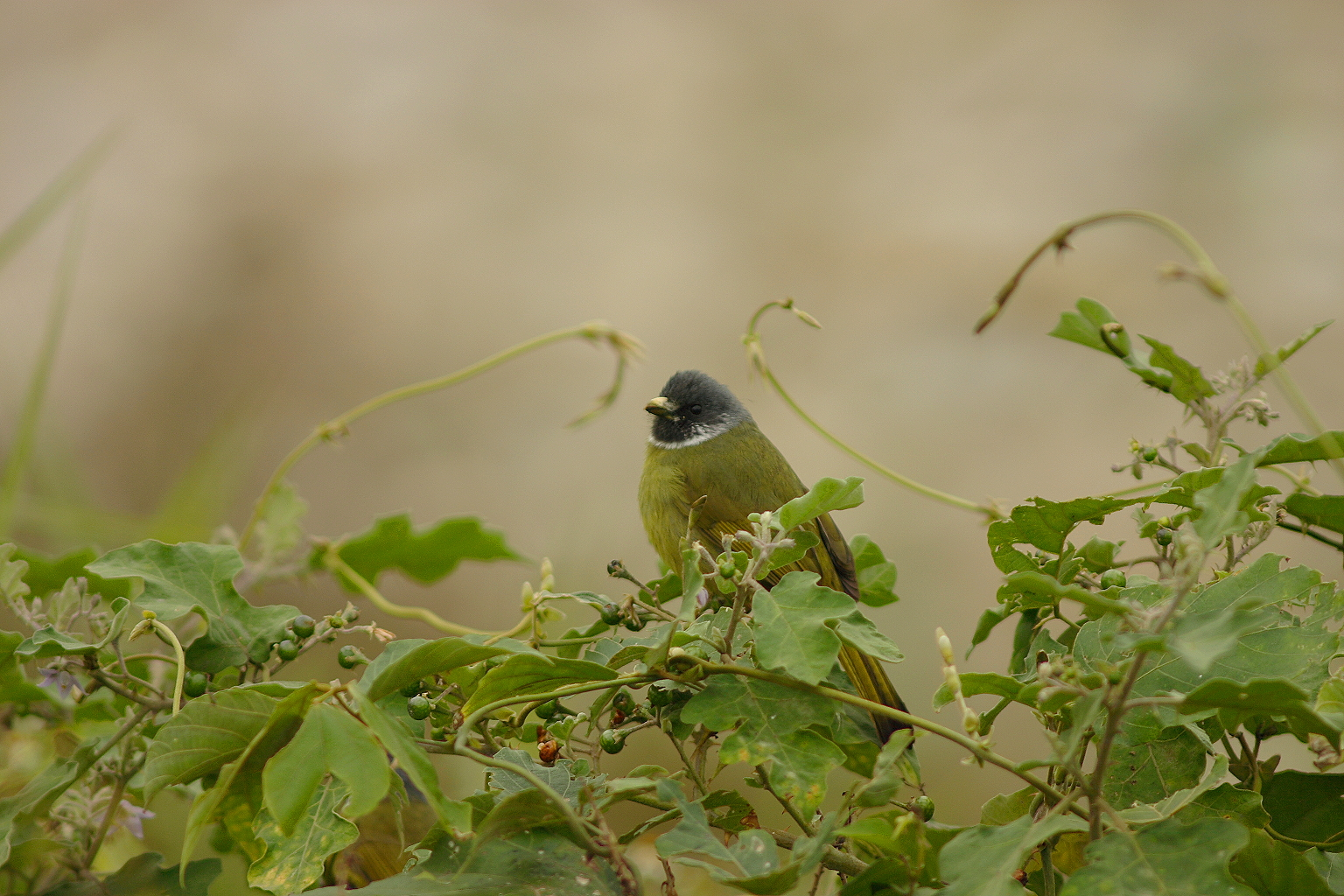
- Collared finchbill (Spizixos semitorques)

Scientific classification
- Kingdom: Animalia
- Phylum: Chordata
- Class: Aves
- Order: Passeriformes
- Family: Pycnonotidae
- Genus: Spizixos; Blyth, 1845

Type species
- Spizixos canifrons (Crested finchbill) Blyth, 1845
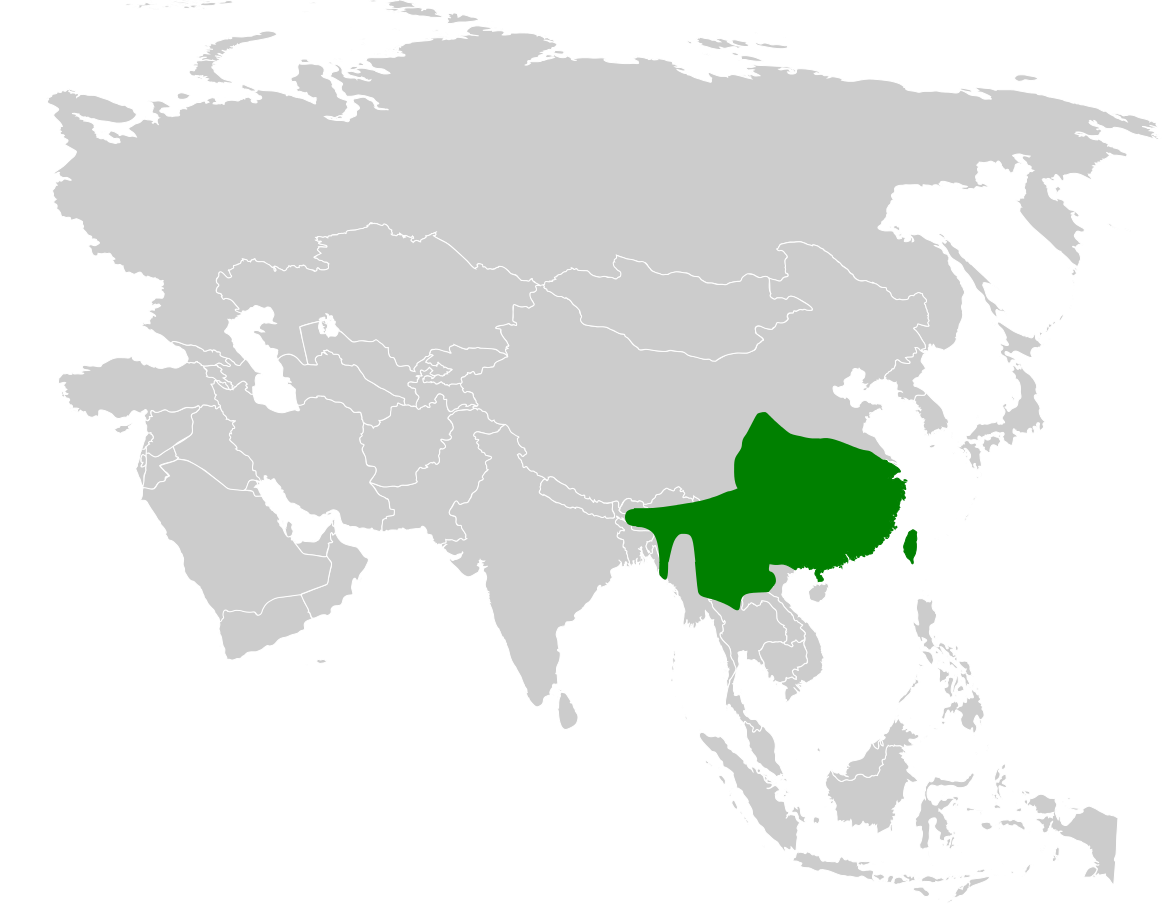

Synonyms
- Spizixus

= Spizixos =

Genus of birds

Spizixos is a genus of passerine birds in the bulbul family Pycnonotidae.

== Taxonomy ==
The genus Spizixos was introduced in 1845 by the English zoologist Edward Blyth to accommodate the crested finchbill. The word Spizixos combines the Ancient Greek spiza meaning "finch" with the genus name Ixos that was introduced by Coenraad Jacob Temminck in 1825.

The genus contains the following two species:

Image	Common name	Scientific name	Distribution
	Crested finchbill	Spizixos canifrons	Southeastern Asia from China and India to Indochina.
	Collared finchbill	Spizixos semitorques	China, Taiwan, Japan and Vietnam.
