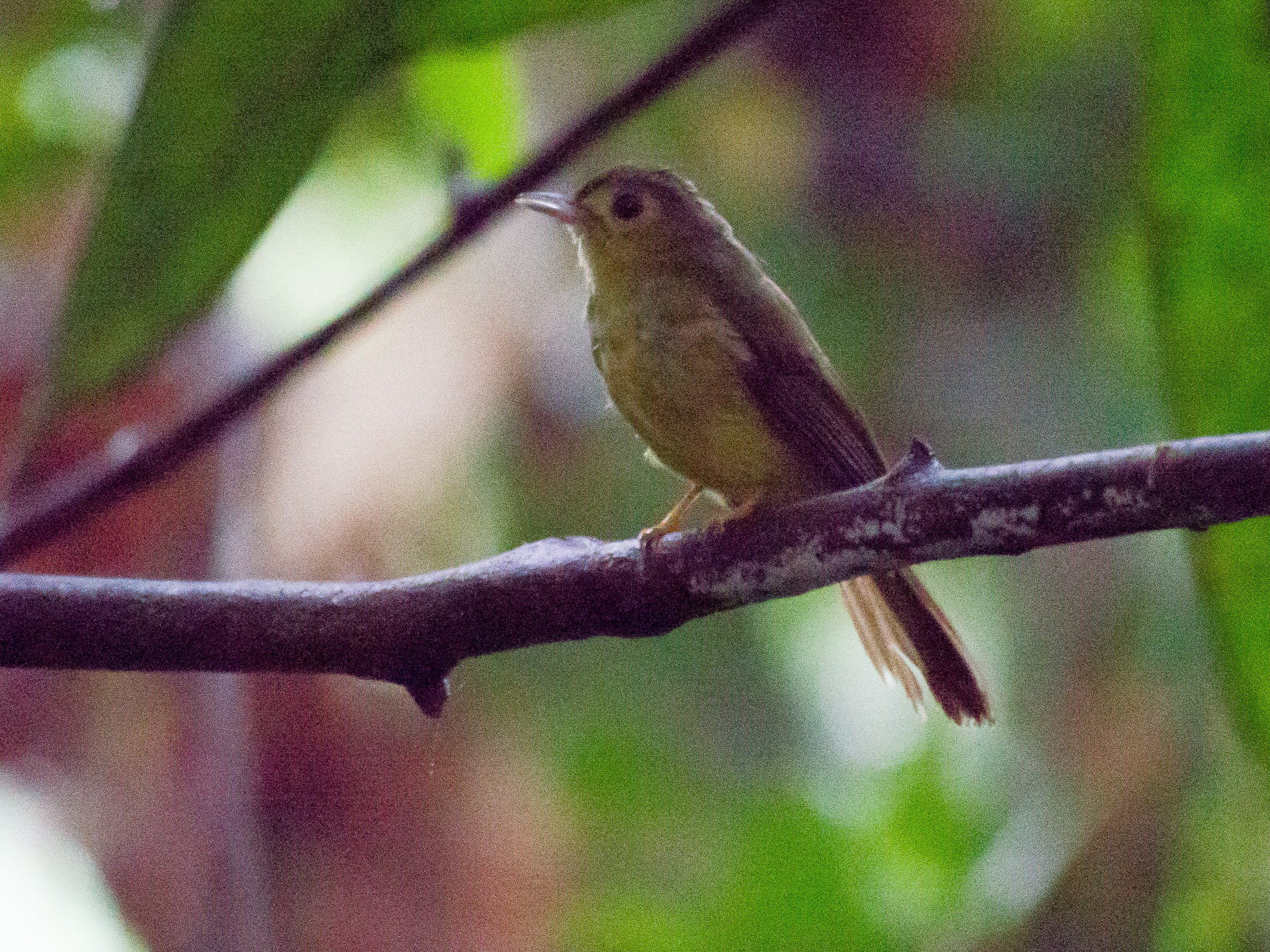

Conservation status
- Least Concern (IUCN 3.1)

Scientific classification
- Kingdom: Animalia
- Phylum: Chordata
- Class: Aves
- Order: Passeriformes
- Family: Pycnonotidae
- Genus: Tricholestes; Salvadori, 1874
- Species: T. criniger

Binomial name
- Tricholestes criniger (Blyth, 1845)
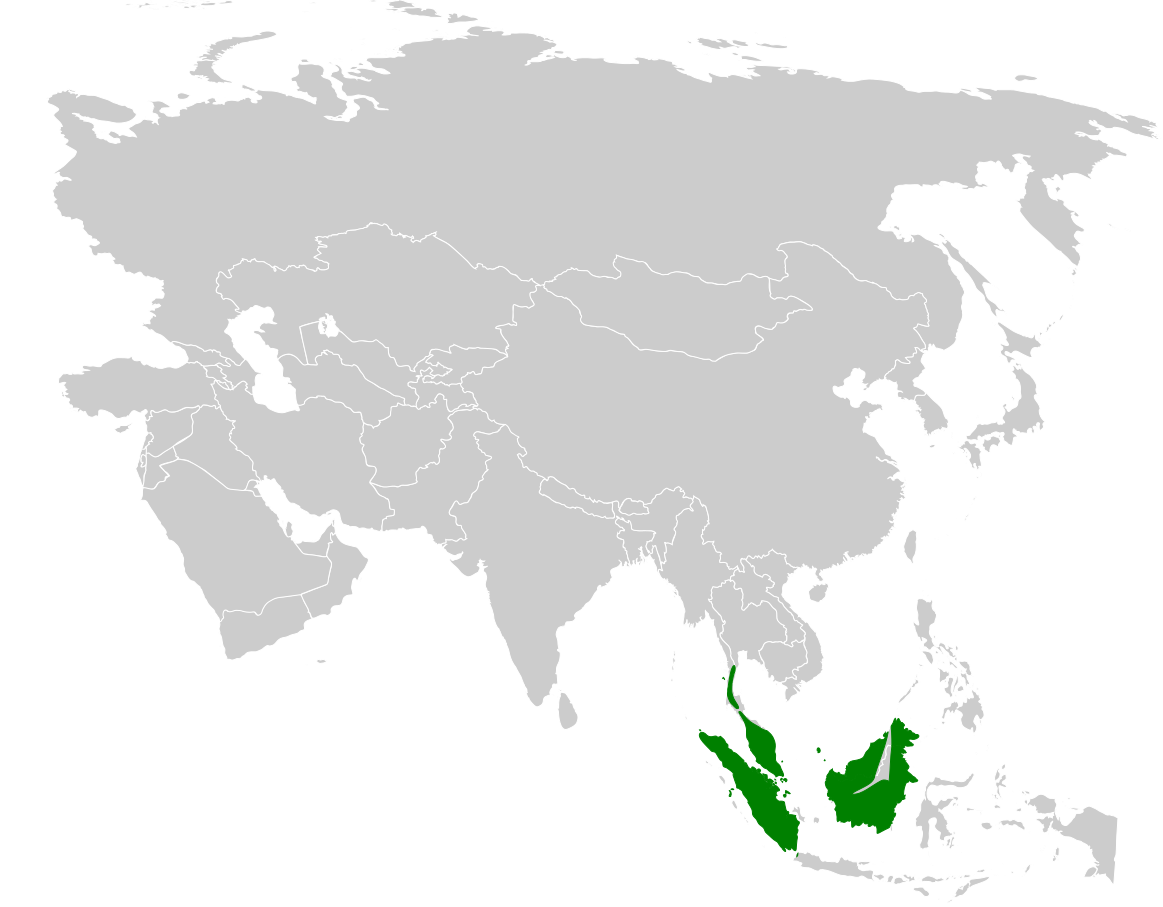

Synonyms
- (Genus): Myiosobus Reichenow, 1891; (Species): Brachypodius criniger Blyth, 1845; Hypsipetes criniger; Myiosobus fulvicauda Reichenow, 1891; Trichophorus minutus Hartlaub, 1853

= Hairy-backed bulbul =

Species of bird

The hairy-backed bulbul (Tricholestes criniger) is a songbird species in the bulbul family, Pycnonotidae. It is the sole species contained within the monotypic genus Tricholestes. It is found on the Malay Peninsula, Sumatra, and Borneo. Its natural habitat is subtropical or tropical moist lowland forests.

== Taxonomy and systematics ==
The hairy-backed bulbul was originally described in the genus Brachypodius (a synonym for Pycnonotus). Alternatively, some authorities have classified the hairy-backed bulbul in the genera Trichophorus (a synonym for Criniger) and Hypsipetes.

=== Subspecies ===
Three subspecies are currently recognized:

- T. c. criniger - (Blyth, 1845): Found on the Malay Peninsula and eastern Sumatra
- T. c. sericeus - (Blyth, 1865): Originally described as a separate species in the genus Criniger. Found on western Sumatra
- T. c. viridis - (Bonaparte, 1854): Originally described as a separate species in the genus Trichophoropsis (a synonym for Setornis). Found on Borneo

== Description ==
The hairy-backed bulbul is a small (16–17 cm long, weigh 12–21 g), relatively quiet bulbul with a slightly rounded tail and strong rictal bristles. It is olive above and yellowish below, with key features including pale yellowish lores and a broad eye ring, a dark rufescent olive-brown cap and neck, olive-rufous uppertail-coverts and upperwings, a bright rufous-brown tail with creamy white tips, a creamy white chin and throat merging into a yellow breast, and hair-like filoplumes on the back (often concealed). It has small, weak legs and feet, a dark brown iris, a light blue-grey bill, and pale greenish-brown legs. Sexes are similar, with females slightly smaller. Juveniles have a grey-brown iris and pale fleshy pink legs. The subspecies sericeus is larger than the nominate form, with duller yellow undertail-coverts; and viridis is similar, but brighter on the upperparts.
