= Tiny greenbul =

The Tiny greenbul has been split into 2 species:

- Lowland tiny greenbul, Phyllastrephus debilis
- Montane tiny greenbul, Phyllastrephus albigula
