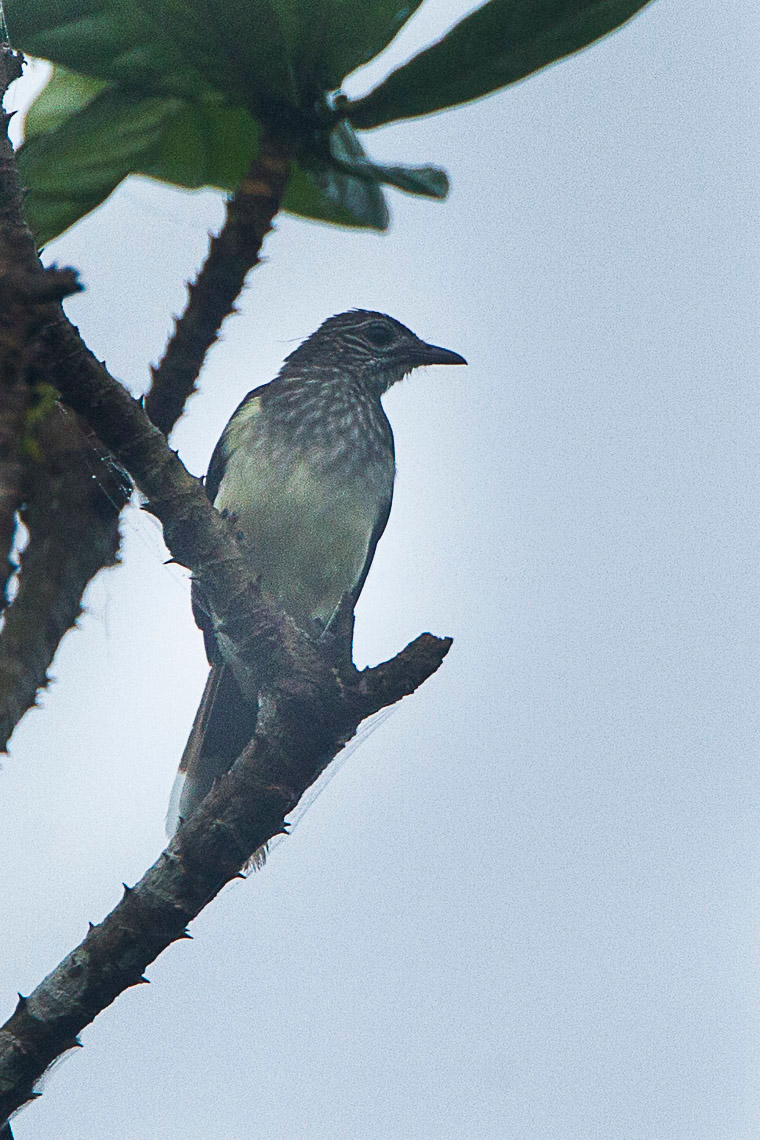
- In Kakum NP, Ghana

Conservation status
- Least Concern (IUCN 3.1)

Scientific classification
- Kingdom: Animalia
- Phylum: Chordata
- Class: Aves
- Order: Passeriformes
- Family: Pycnonotidae
- Genus: Thescelocichla; Oberholser, 1905
- Species: T. leucopleura

Binomial name
- Thescelocichla leucopleura (Cassin, 1855)
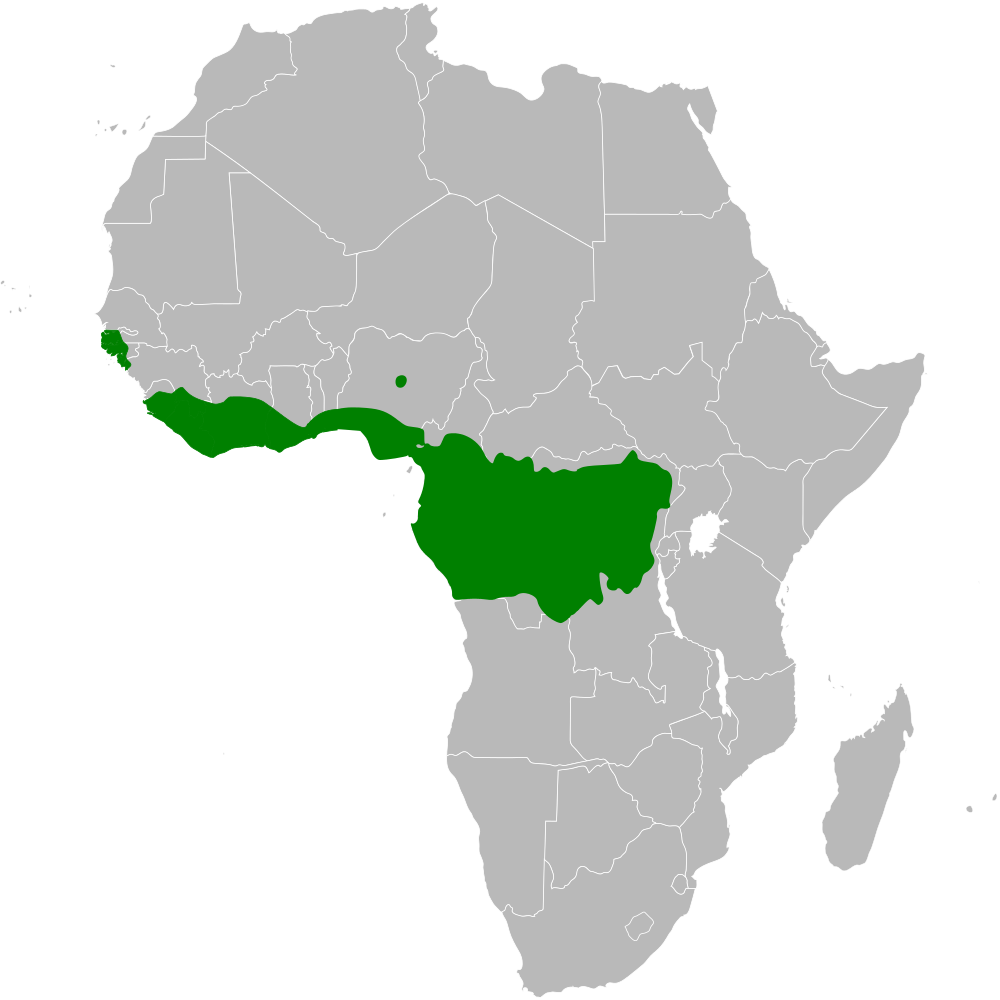

Synonyms
- Phyllastrephus leucopleurus

= Swamp palm bulbul =

Species of bird

The swamp palm bulbul (Thescelocichla leucopleura), is a species of songbird in the bulbul family, Pycnonotidae. It is monotypic within the genus Thescelocichla.

== Taxonomy and systematics ==
The swamp palm bulbul was originally described in the genus Phyllastrephus. Alternative names for the swamp palm bulbul include the swamp bulbul, swamp greenbul, swamp palm greenbul, white-tailed greenbul and white-tailed palm greenbul. The alternate name 'white-tailed greenbul' is also used by the honeyguide greenbul and Sjöstedt's greenbul.

== Distribution and habitat ==
The swamp palm bulbul is found from Senegal and Gambia to north-eastern and central Democratic Republic of the Congo and northern Angola. Its natural habitats are subtropical or tropical dry forests, subtropical or tropical swamps, and moist savanna.

== Diet ==
It is an insectivore.
