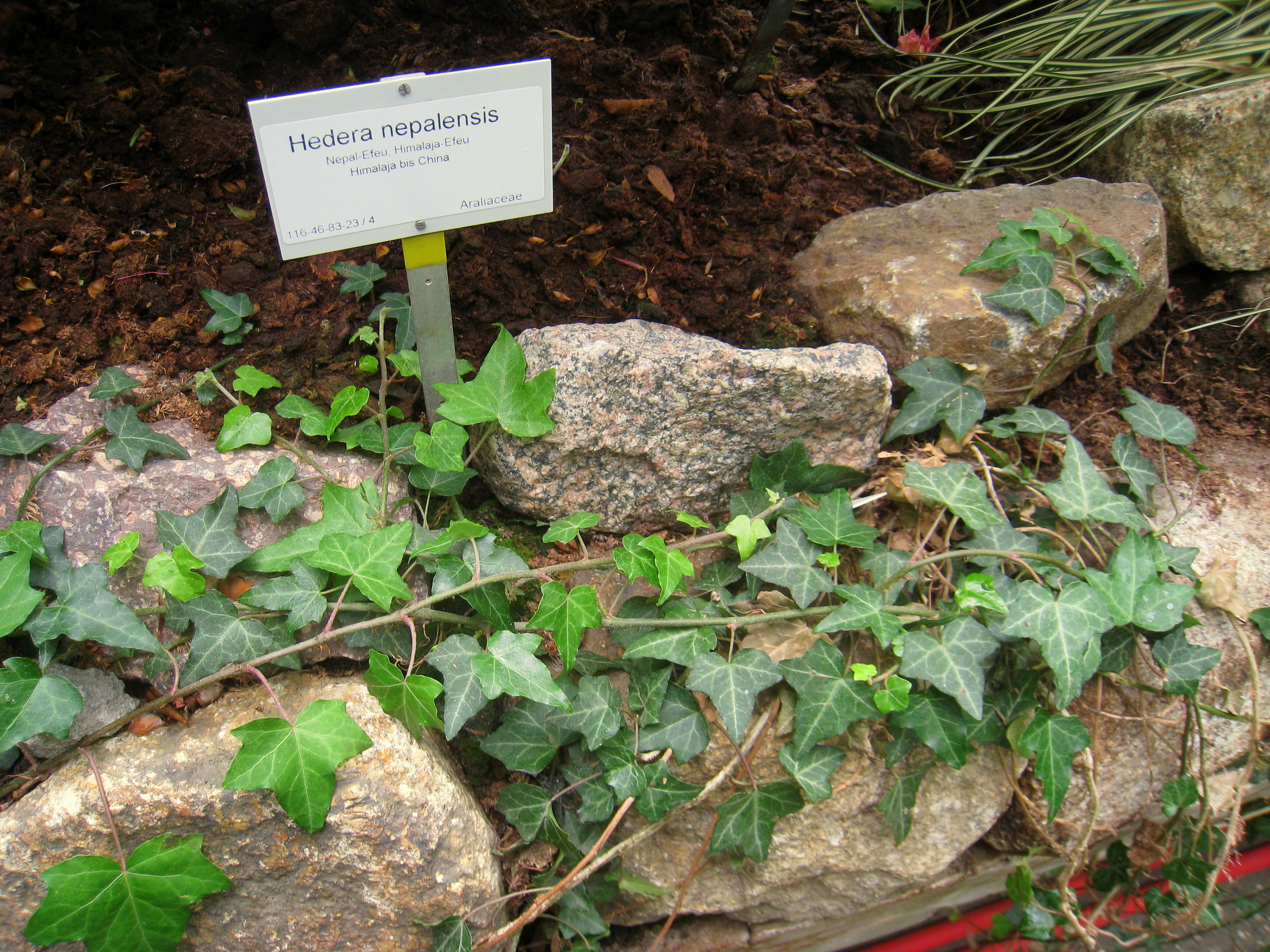

Scientific classification
- Kingdom: Plantae
- Clade: Tracheophytes
- Clade: Angiosperms
- Clade: Eudicots
- Clade: Asterids
- Order: Apiales
- Family: Araliaceae
- Genus: Hedera
- Species: H. nepalensis

Binomial name
- Hedera nepalensis K.Koch

Synonyms
- Hedera cinerea (Hibberd) Bean; Hedera helix var. chrysocarpa DC.; Hedera helix var. cinerea Hibberd; Hedera helix var. himalaica Hibberd; Hedera himalaica Tobler; Hedera himalaica (Hibberd) Carrière; Cissus wallichiana Turcz.

= Hedera nepalensis =

Species of vine

Hedera nepalensis (Himalayan ivy, chang chun teng) is a species of flowering plant in the family Araliaceae. It is a perennial Ivy native to Nepal and Bhutan, as well as Afghanistan, Pakistan, India, China, Laos, Myanmar, Thailand, and Vietnam, at altitudes of about 1000–3000 m. Plants grow up to 30 m in height, with simple leaves ranging from 2–15 cm long, and yellow flowers.

== Morphology ==
Stem: creeping or climbing to a height of 30 m with adventitious roots. Evergreen foliage, dark green, glossy, lighter underneath, glabrous, leathery, lanceolate, oval, to klapowanych (flaps odd, usually 3, triangular), u heart-shaped base of the wedge, the top slightly pointed or blunt. Flowers: bisexual, small, 5-fold, meeting at the base within the ovate panicles. Flower stalks (length 7–12 mm) and Flowering hairy. Calyx entire edges, retained. Petals yellow crown. Stamens 5, anthers 1–2 mm long. Pillar short neck, single, Fruit is a drupes, flattened, 5–7 mm long, 5–10 mm wide, with orange to red.

== Ecology ==
The plant blooms from October to April.

Plant toxic, all parts are poisonous because they contain saponins (e.g. hederynę), which are irritating to the skin, and conjunctiva of eyes, and after ingestion induce gastrointestinal nervous system, disturbances. Can occur hemolysis and erythrocytes.

It occurs mostly in moist soil in shade, at the height of 1000–3000 m as climbs over rocks and tree trunks by adventitious roots, rarely used as a ground cover or decorative climber in gardens and parks. Resistance to frost apparently large (up to 8 zones USDA).

There are two varieties or subspecies:

- Hedera nepalensis var. nepalensis
- ''Hedera nepalensis K. Koch var. Sinensis (Tobler) Rehder - occurs in the China.
