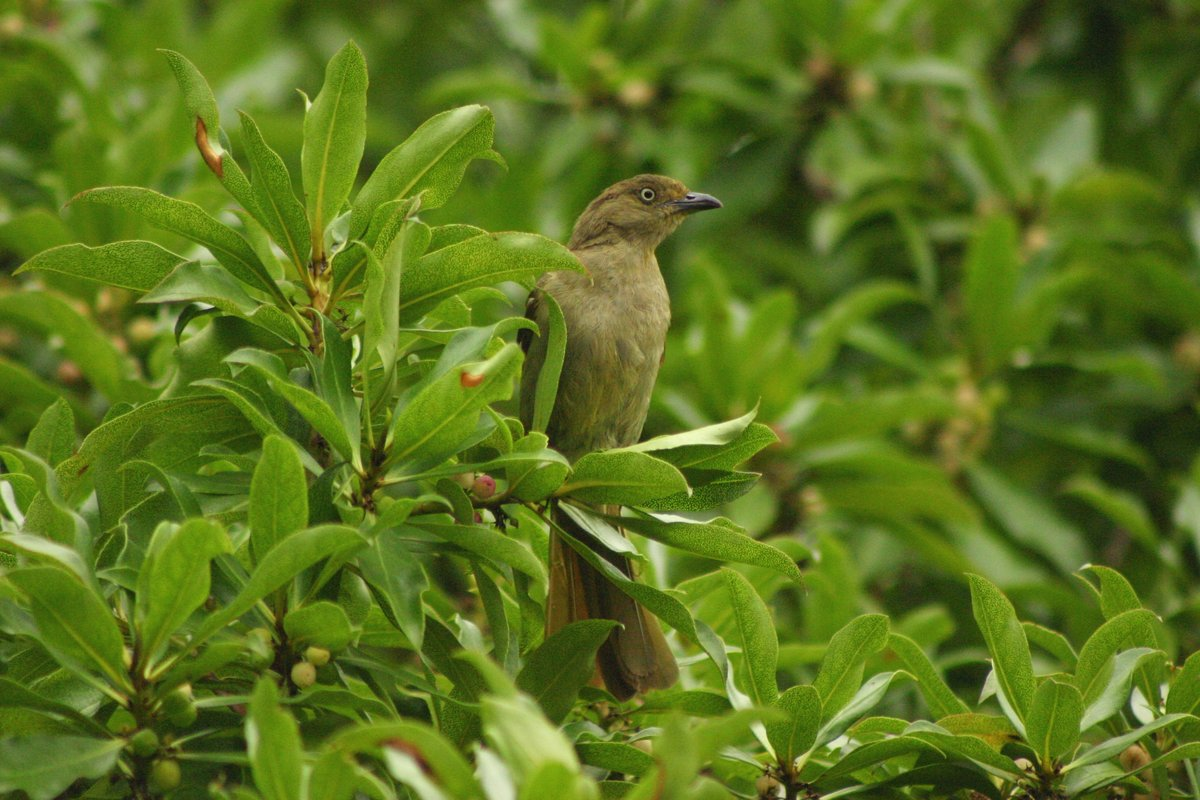
- Sombre greenbul Andropadus importunus

Scientific classification
- Domain: Eukaryota
- Kingdom: Animalia
- Phylum: Chordata
- Class: Aves
- Order: Passeriformes
- Family: Pycnonotidae

Genera
- See text

= Greenbul =

Greenbuls

Common name for certain birds in the family Pycnonotidae

The greenbuls are a group of birds within the bulbul family Pycnonotidae, found only within Africa. They are all largely drab olive-green above, and paler below, with few distinguishing features.

The "aberrant greenbuls" of the genera Bernieria and Xanthomixis are actually Malagasy warblers. To recognize this, they are also called bernieria and tetrakas rather than greenbuls. Likewise, the golden greenbul is not a typical greenbul, but apparently the representative of a distinct and ancient lineage of bulbuls, which might include the black-collared bulbul. A few species within some of the genera in this group are called brownbuls or leafloves.

- Genus Phyllastrephus
  - Grey-olive greenbul (Phyllastrephus cerviniventris)
  - Pale-olive greenbul (Phyllastrephus fulviventris)
  - Baumann's olive greenbul (Phyllastrephus baumanni)
  - Toro olive greenbul (Phyllastrephus hypochloris)
  - Sassi's olive greenbul (Phyllastrephus lorenzi)
  - Fischer's greenbul (Phyllastrephus fischeri)
  - Cabanis's greenbul (Phyllastrephus cabanisi)
  - Placid greenbul (Phyllastrephus placidus)
  - Cameroon olive greenbul (Phyllastrephus poensis)
  - Icterine greenbul (Phyllastrephus icterinus)
  - Xavier's greenbul (Phyllastrephus xavieri)
  - White-throated greenbul (Phyllastrephus albigularis)
  - Yellow-streaked greenbul (Phyllastrephus flavostriatus)
  - Sharpe's greenbul (Phyllastrephus alfredi)
  - Grey-headed greenbul (Phyllastrephus poliocephalus)
  - Lowland tiny greenbul (Phyllastrephus debilis)
  - Montane tiny greenbul (Phyllastrephus albigula)
- Genus Arizelocichla
  - Shelley's greenbul (Arizelocichla masukuensis)
  - Kakamega greenbul (Arizelocichla kakamegae)
  - Cameroon greenbul (Arizelocichla montana)
  - Western greenbul (Arizelocichla tephrolaema)
  - Olive-breasted greenbul (Arizelocichla kikuyuensis)
  - Mountain greenbul (Arizelocichla nigriceps)
  - Uluguru greenbul (Arizelocichla neumanni)
  - Black-browed greenbul (Arizelocichla fusciceps)
  - Yellow-throated greenbul (Arizelocichla chlorigula)
  - Stripe-cheeked greenbul (Arizelocichla milanjensis)
  - Olive-headed greenbul (Arizelocichla olivaceiceps)
  - Stripe-faced greenbul (Arizelocichla striifacies)
- Genus Eurillas
  - Little greenbul (Eurillas virens)
  - Little grey greenbul (Eurillas gracilis)
  - Ansorge's greenbul (Eurillas ansorgei)
  - Plain greenbul (Eurillas curvirostris)
  - Yellow-whiskered greenbul (Eurillas latirostris)
- Genus Stelgidillas
  - Slender-billed greenbul (Stelgidillas gracilirostris)
- Genus Andropadus
  - Sombre greenbul (Andropadus importunus)
- Genus Criniger
  - Western bearded greenbul (Criniger barbatus)
  - Eastern bearded greenbul (Criniger chloronotus)
  - Red-tailed greenbul (Criniger calurus)
  - White-bearded greenbul (Criniger ndussumensis)
  - Yellow-bearded greenbul (Criniger olivaceus)
- Genus Thescelocichla
  - Swamp palm bulbul (Thescelocichla leucopleura)
- Genus Chlorocichla
  - Joyful greenbul (Chlorocichla laetissima)
  - Prigogine's greenbul (Chlorocichla prigoginei)
  - Yellow-bellied greenbul (Chlorocichla flaviventris)
  - Falkenstein's greenbul (Chlorocichla falkensteini)
  - Simple greenbul (Chlorocichla simplex)
- Genus Ixonotus - tentatively placed here
  - Spotted greenbul (Ixonotus guttatus)
- Genus Baeopogon
  - Honeyguide greenbul (Baeopogon indicator)
  - Sjöstedt's greenbul (Baeopogon clamans)
- Genus Calyptocichla - not a typical bulbul
  - Golden greenbul (Calyptocichla serinus)
