= Southern mountain greenbul =

Southern mountain greenbul may refer to:

- Black-browed greenbul, a species of bird found in south-eastern Africa
- Yellow-throated greenbul, a species of bird found in Tanzania
