= Green-throated greenbul =

Green-throated greenbul may refer to:

- Olive-headed greenbul, a species of bird found in south-eastern Africa
- Yellow-throated greenbul, a species of bird found in Tanzania
