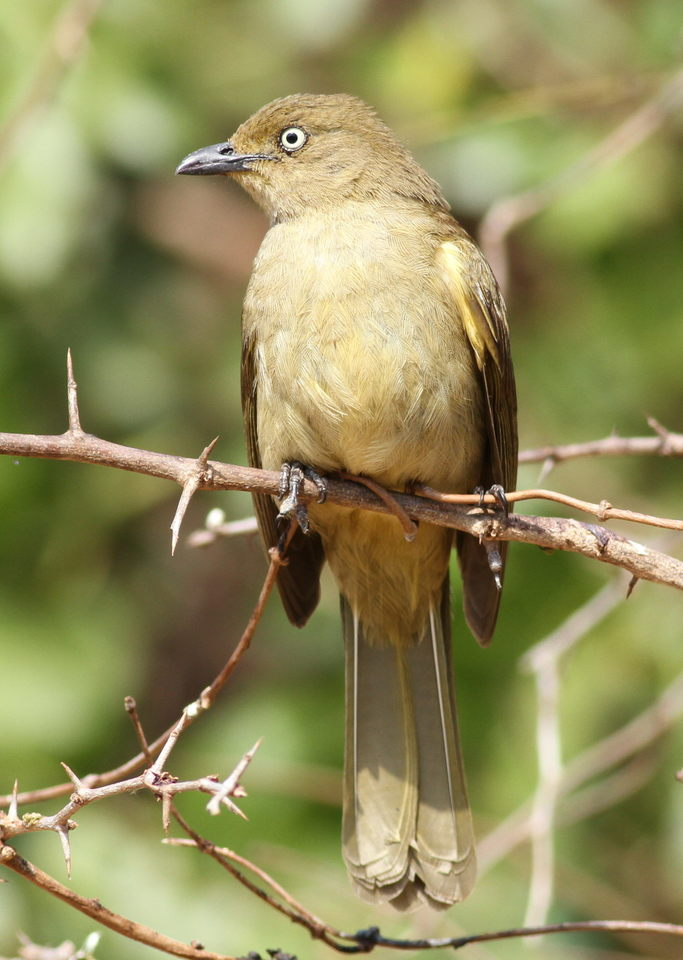
- A. i. oleaginus at uMkhuze Game Reserve, KwaZulu-Natal, South Africa

Conservation status
- Least Concern (IUCN 3.1)

Scientific classification
- Kingdom: Animalia
- Phylum: Chordata
- Class: Aves
- Order: Passeriformes
- Family: Pycnonotidae
- Genus: Andropadus; Swainson, 1832
- Species: A. importunus

Binomial name
- Andropadus importunus (Vieillot, 1818)
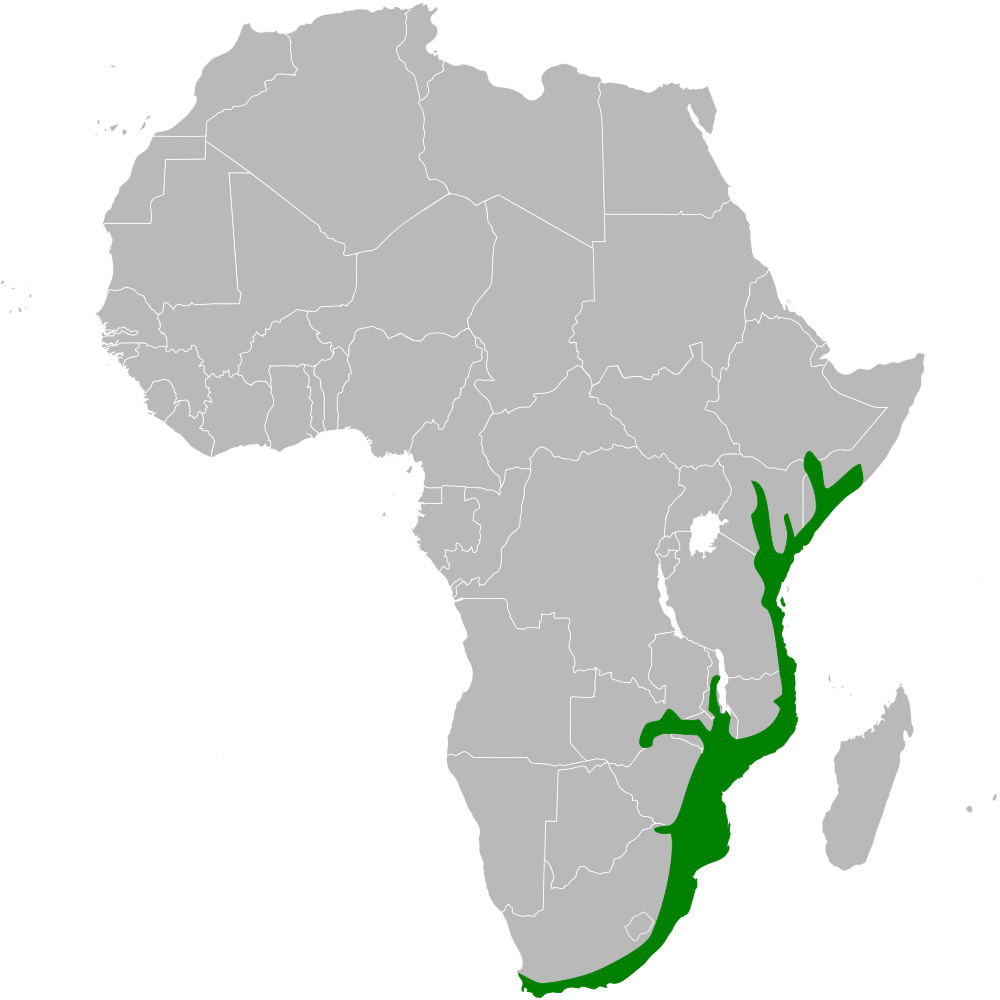
- resident range

Synonyms
- Pycnonotus importunus; Turdus importunus

= Sombre greenbul =

Species of bird

The sombre greenbul (Andropadus importunus) is a member of the bulbul family of passerine birds. It is a resident breeder in coastal bush, evergreen forest and dry shrub land in eastern and southern Africa. It is the only member of the genus Andropadus.

== Taxonomy and systematics ==
Eighteen species of greenbuls originally described in the genus Andropadus were re-classified to the genera Arizelocichla, Stelgidillas and Eurillas in 2010. This has left Andropadus as a monotypic genus with the sombre greenbul remaining as its sole extant species.

The sombre greenbul was originally described in the genus Turdus and was later re-classified to the genus Andropadus. Alternatively, some authorities classify the sombre greenbul in the genus Pycnonotus. Alternate names for the sombre greenbul include the sombre bulbul, southern sombre bulbul and southern sombre greenbul.

=== Subspecies ===
Four subspecies of the sombre greenbul are recognized:

- Zanzibar sombre greenbul (A. i. insularis) - Hartlaub, 1861: Originally described as a separate species. Includes Frick's greenbul which was also originally described as a separate species. Found from southern Ethiopia and southern Somalia to eastern Tanzania
- Transvaal sombre greenbul (A. i. importunus) - (Vieillot, 1818): Found from the highlands of northern South Africa and western Eswatini south along coast to Western Cape
- Endoto sombre greenbul (A. i. oleaginus) - Peters, W, 1868: Found in southern Zimbabwe, southern Mozambique and lowland northern South Africa
- A. i. hypoxanthus - Sharpe, 1876: Found in south-eastern Tanzania to central Mozambique, central Zimbabwe and south-central Zambia

=== Former species ===
Formerly, some authorities also considered the following species (or subspecies) as species within the genus Andropadus:

- Shelley's greenbul (as Andropadus masukuensis)
- Kakamega greenbul (as Andropadus kakamegae)
- Cameroon greenbul (as Andropadus montanus or Andropadus concolor)
- Western greenbul (as Andropadus tephrolaemus)
- Olive-breasted greenbul (as Andropadus kikuyuensis)
- Mountain greenbul (as Andropadus nigriceps)
- Uluguru greenbul (as Andropadus neumanni)
- Black-browed greenbul (as Andropadus fusciceps)
- Yellow-throated greenbul (as Andropadus chlorigula)
- Stripe-cheeked greenbul (as Andropadus milanjensis)
- Olive-headed greenbul (as Andropadus olivaceiceps)
- Stripe-faced greenbul (as Andropadus striifacies or Andropadus striifascies)
- Slender-billed greenbul (as Andropadus gracilirostris)
- Little greenbul (as Andropadus virens)
- Little grey greenbul (as Andropadus gracilis)
- Ansorge's greenbul (as Andropadus ansorgei)
- Kavirondo little grey greenbul (as Charitillas kavirondensis)
- Plain greenbul (as Andropadus alexandri or Andropadus curvirostris)
- Yellow-whiskered greenbul (as Andropadus latirostris)
- Joyful greenbul (as Andropadus laetissimus)
- Falkenstein's greenbul (as Andropadus falkensteini)
- Yellow-streaked greenbul (as Andropadus flavostriatus)

== Description ==
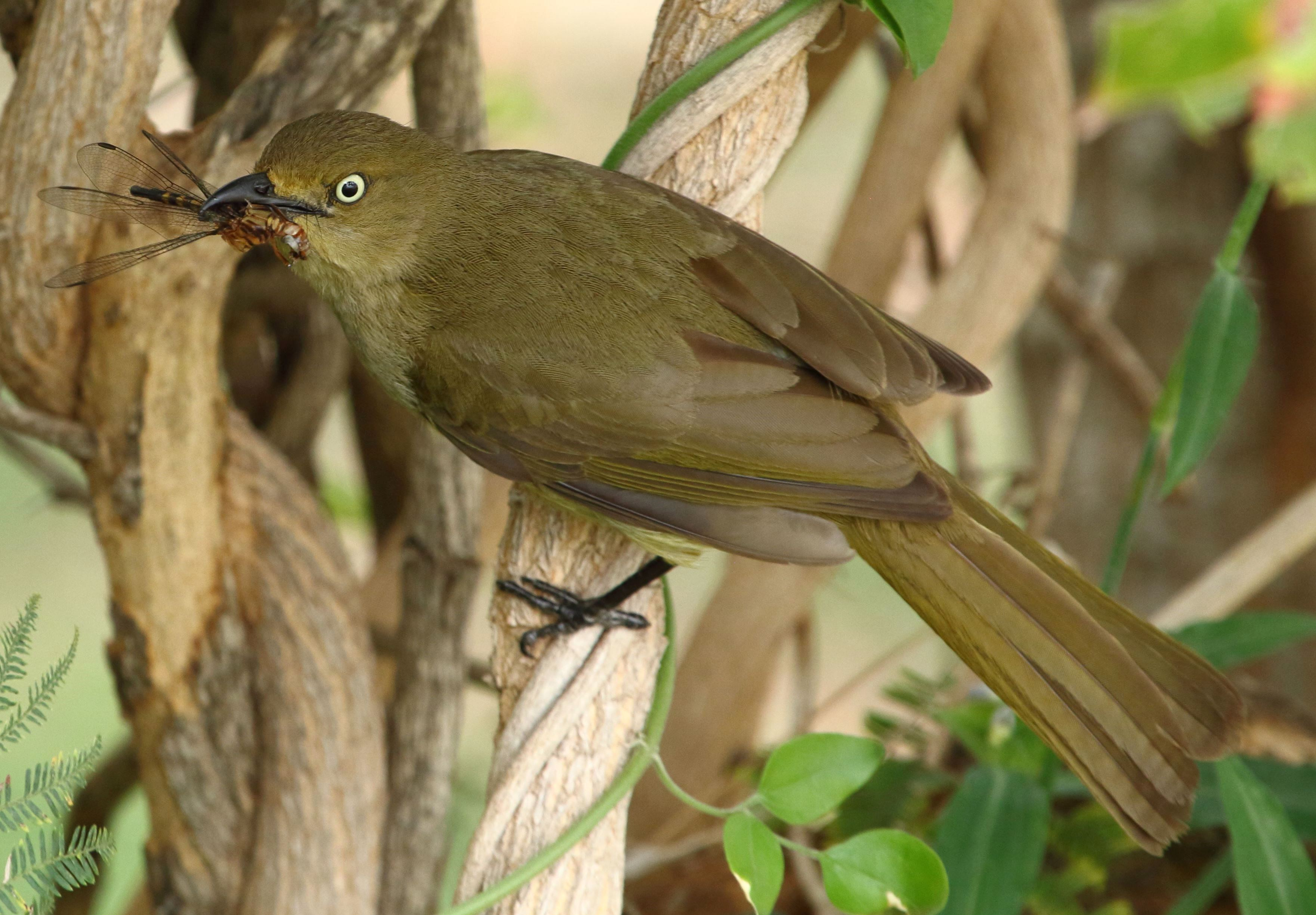
Nominate subspecies at the Crocodile River, Mpumalanga, South Africa

A.i. insularis with yellow underparts, Zanzibar

Back view of A.i. insularis, Zanzibar

The sombre greenbul is 15–18 cm (5.9–7.1 in) long, with mainly dull greyish olive-green plumage, paler on the underparts than above. There are variations in colour based on habitat range. Individuals located in southern Africa tend to be plain, olive-green. To the north, birds are yellower with greener upper parts. It has a white iris. The sexes are similar in plumage, but juveniles are even duller than the adult and have dark, grey eyes. There is no colour distinction among sexes. The subspecies A. i. hypoxanthus is much yellower below than the nominate subspecies.

A.i. insularis calling, Zanzibar

The sombre greenbul is a vocal species, and the most typical call is a monotonous, ringing phrase starting with a penetrating single whistle weeeewee, followed by a jumbled chortle and ending off with a rather plaintive, drawn-out whistle willy. If agitated, a call of peeet peeet peeet repeatedly is likely to be heard.

== Behaviour and ecology ==
The sombre greenbul is a common bird, which tends to stay hidden in foliage and is more often heard than seen. It is usually found in pairs or small groups foraging for insects, fruit and small snails.
