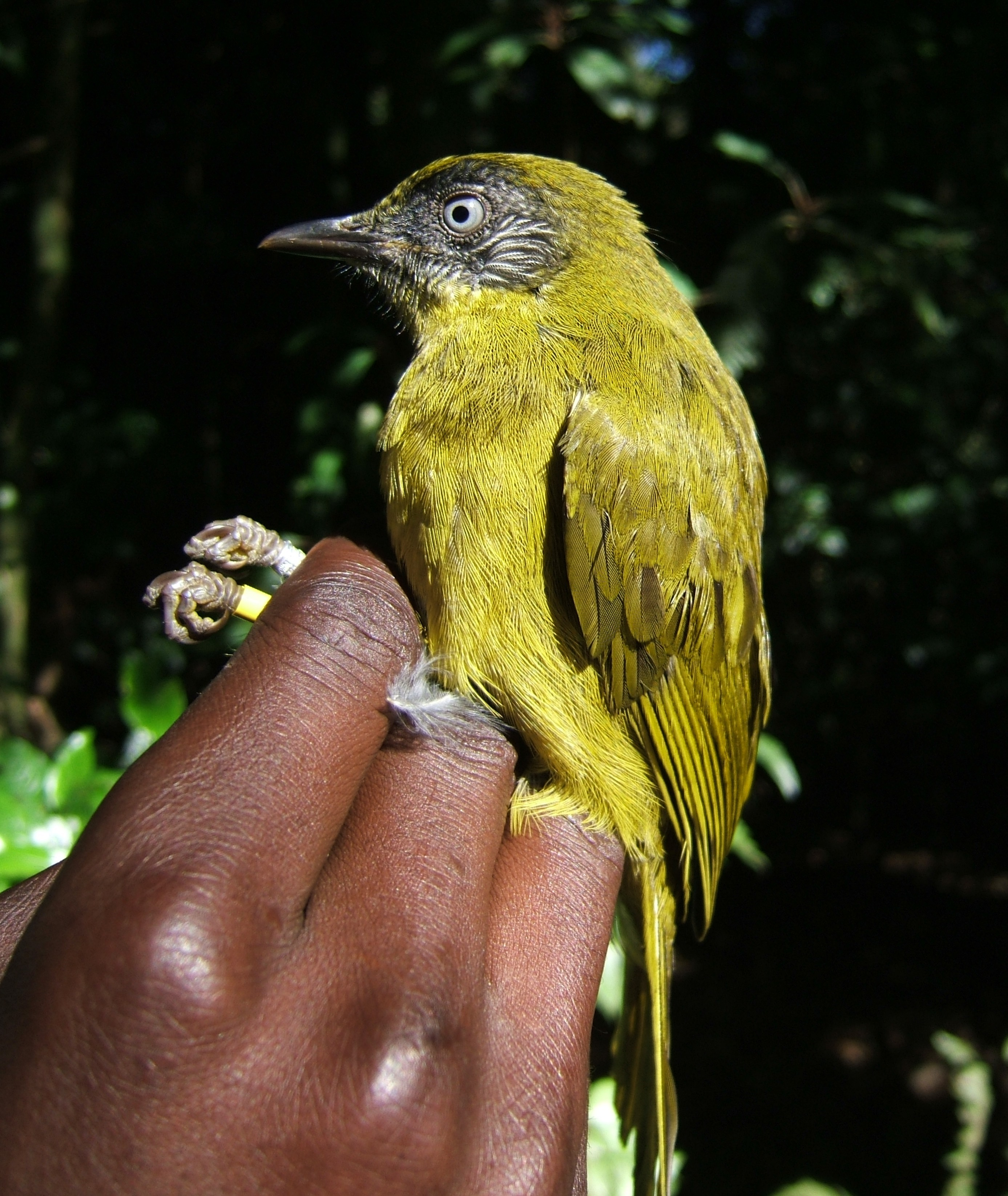
- Olive-headed greenbul (Arizelocichla striifacies).

Scientific classification
- Kingdom: Animalia
- Phylum: Chordata
- Class: Aves
- Order: Passeriformes
- Family: Pycnonotidae
- Genus: Arizelocichla; Oberholser, 1905

Type species
- Xenocichla nigriceps (black-headed mountain greenbul) Shelley, 1889

Species
- See text
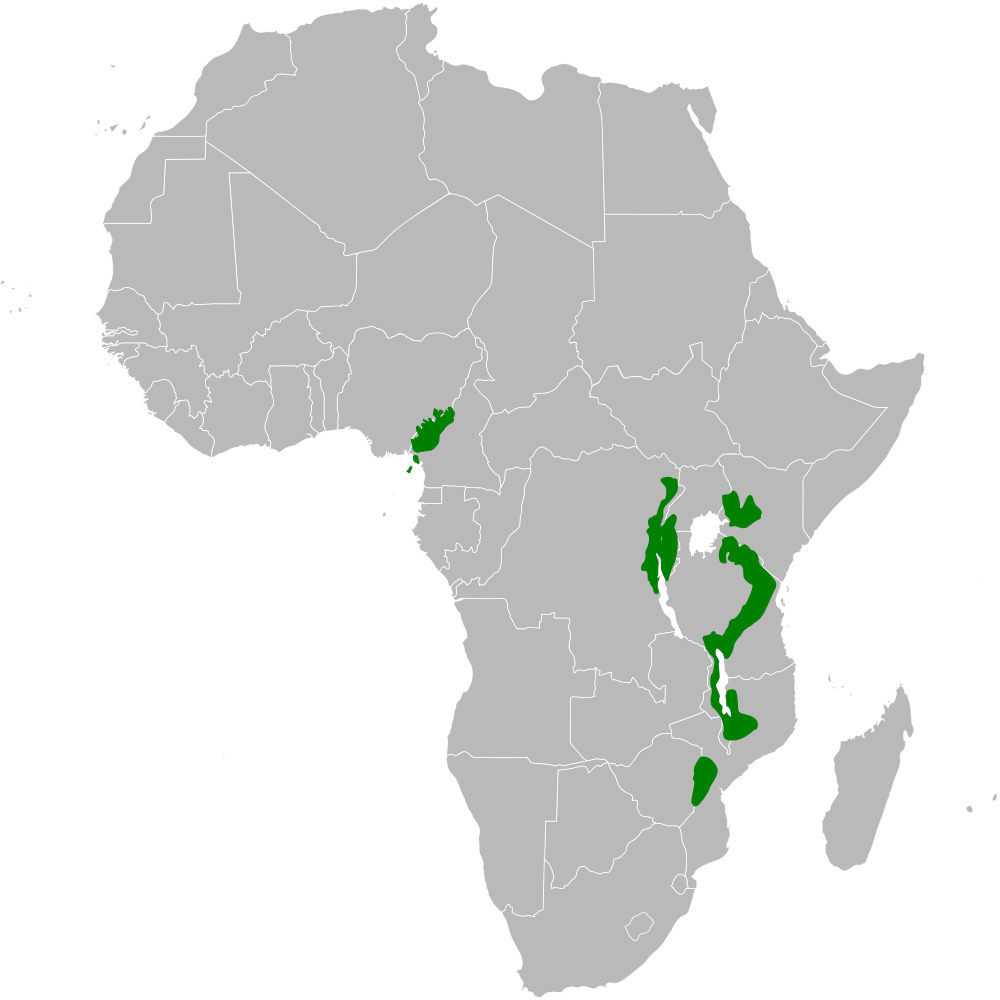

= Arizelocichla =

Genus of birds

Arizelocichla is a genus of greenbuls, songbirds in the bulbul family (Pycnonotidae). The genus was revived in 2010 when twelve species of bulbuls from the genus Andropadus were separated and re-classified in the genus Arizelocichla.

== Taxonomy ==
A molecular phylogenetic study of the bulbuls published in 2007 found that the genus Andropadus was polyphyletic. As part of a reorganization to create monophyletic genera, 12 species from Andropadus were moved to the resurrected genus Arizelocichla that had been introduced in 1905 by the American ornithologist Harry C. Oberholser with the black-headed mountain greenbul as the type species. The name Arizelocichla combines the Ancient Greek arizēlos meaning "conspicuous" or "admirable" with kikhlē meaning "thrush".

=== Species ===
The genus contains the following ten species:

Image	Common name	Scientific name	Distribution
	Cameroon mountain greenbul	Arizelocichla montana	Western High Plateau
	Western greenbul	Arizelocichla tephrolaema	Western High Plateau and Bioko
	Shelley's greenbul	Arizelocichla masukuensis	Albertine Rift montane forests, Eastern Arc Mountains and western Kenya
	Uluguru mountain greenbul	Arizelocichla neumanni	Uluguru Mountains
	Black-browed mountain greenbul	Arizelocichla fusciceps	mountains of southwestern Tanzania, northern Malawi and western Mozambique
	Yellow-throated greenbul	Arizelocichla chlorigula	Eastern Arc Mountains
	Kikuyu mountain greenbul	Arizelocichla kikuyuensis	Lake Victoria region
	Black-headed mountain greenbul	Arizelocichla nigriceps	Albertine Rift montane forests, Eastern Arc Mountains and mountains of Kenya and Tanzania
	Olive-headed greenbul	Arizelocichla striifacies	Eastern Afromontane from northern Tanzania to southern Malawi
	Stripe-cheeked greenbul	Arizelocichla milanjensis	eastern Zimbabwe and western Mozambique
