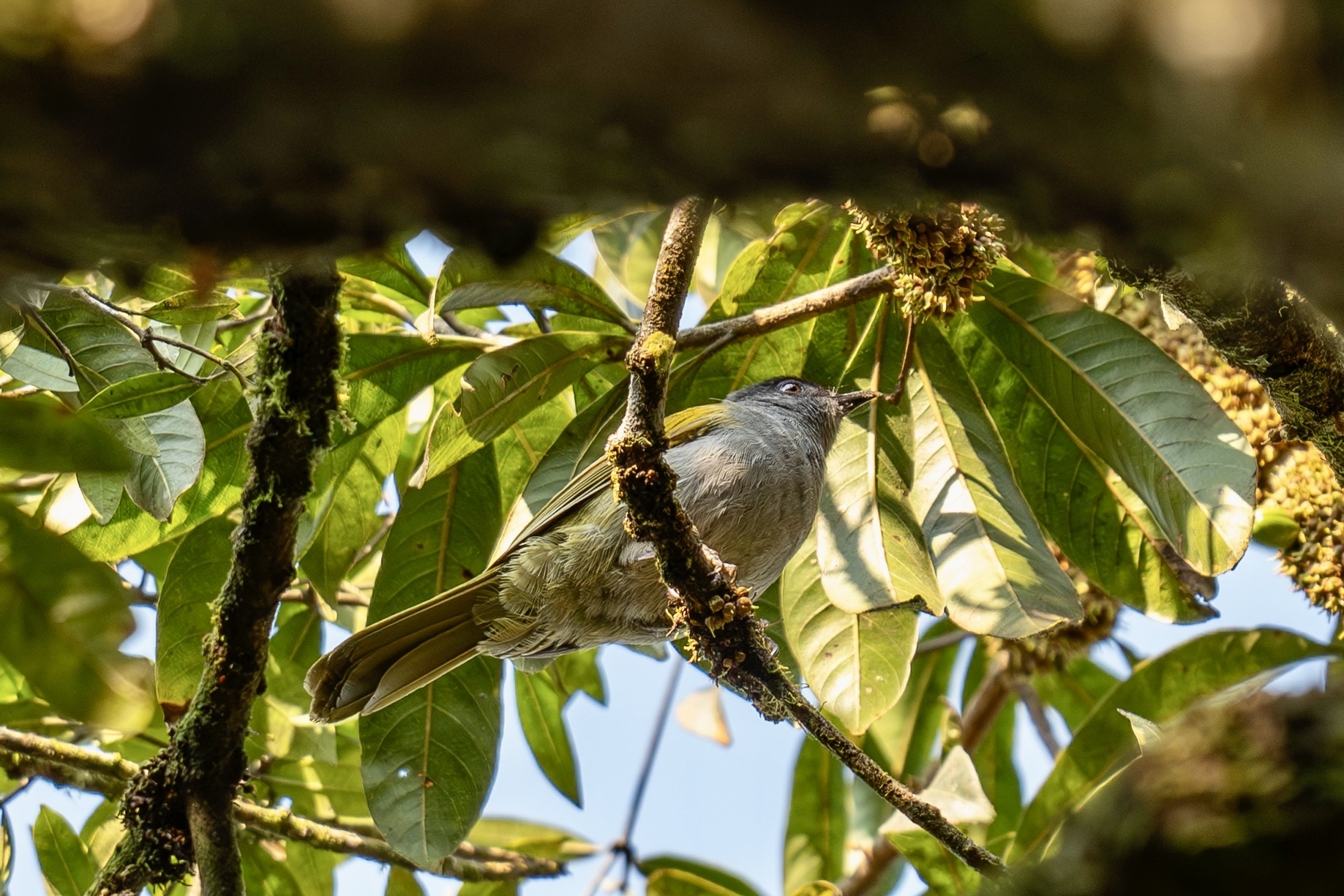

Conservation status
- Least Concern (IUCN 3.1)

Scientific classification
- Kingdom: Animalia
- Phylum: Chordata
- Class: Aves
- Order: Passeriformes
- Family: Pycnonotidae
- Genus: Arizelocichla
- Species: A. neumanni

Binomial name
- Arizelocichla neumanni Hartert, 1922

Synonyms
- Andropadus neumanni; Andropadus nigriceps neumanni; Andropadus tephrolaemus neumanni; Arizelocichla fusciceps neumanni; Arizelocichla nigriceps neumanni; Pycnonotus nigriceps neumanni; Pycnonotus tephrolaemus neumanni

= Uluguru mountain greenbul =

Species of bird

The Uluguru mountain greenbul (Arizelocichla neumanni), formerly sometimes known as the Uluguru greenbul, is a species of the bulbul family of passerine birds. It is found in eastern Tanzania.

== Taxonomy and systematics ==
The Uluguru mountain greenbul was originally described in the genus Arizelocichla in 1922.

It was then classified to the genus Andropadus before being re-classified back to the genus Arizelocichla in 2010. It was considered conspecific with the mountain greenbul until split to form a separate species in 2009. Some authorities have considered the Uluguru mountain greenbul to be a subspecies of the western mountain greenbul, mountain greenbul or black-browed mountain greenbul. Alternate names for the Uluguru mountain greenbul include the Mulanji mountain greenbul and Uluguru greenbul.
