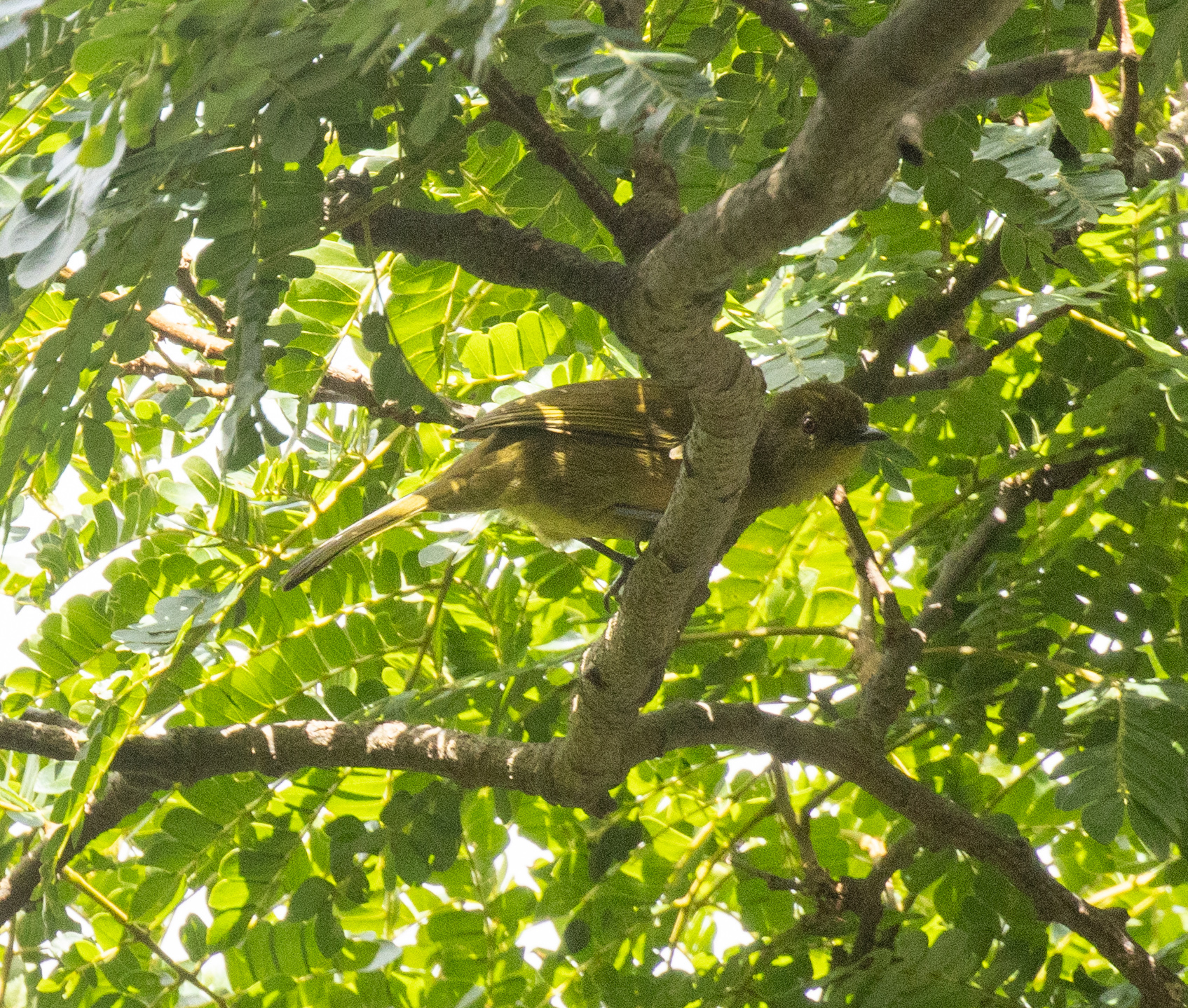

Conservation status
- Least Concern (IUCN 3.1)

Scientific classification
- Kingdom: Animalia
- Phylum: Chordata
- Class: Aves
- Order: Passeriformes
- Family: Pycnonotidae
- Genus: Arizelocichla
- Species: A. montana

Binomial name
- Arizelocichla montana (Reichenow, 1892)
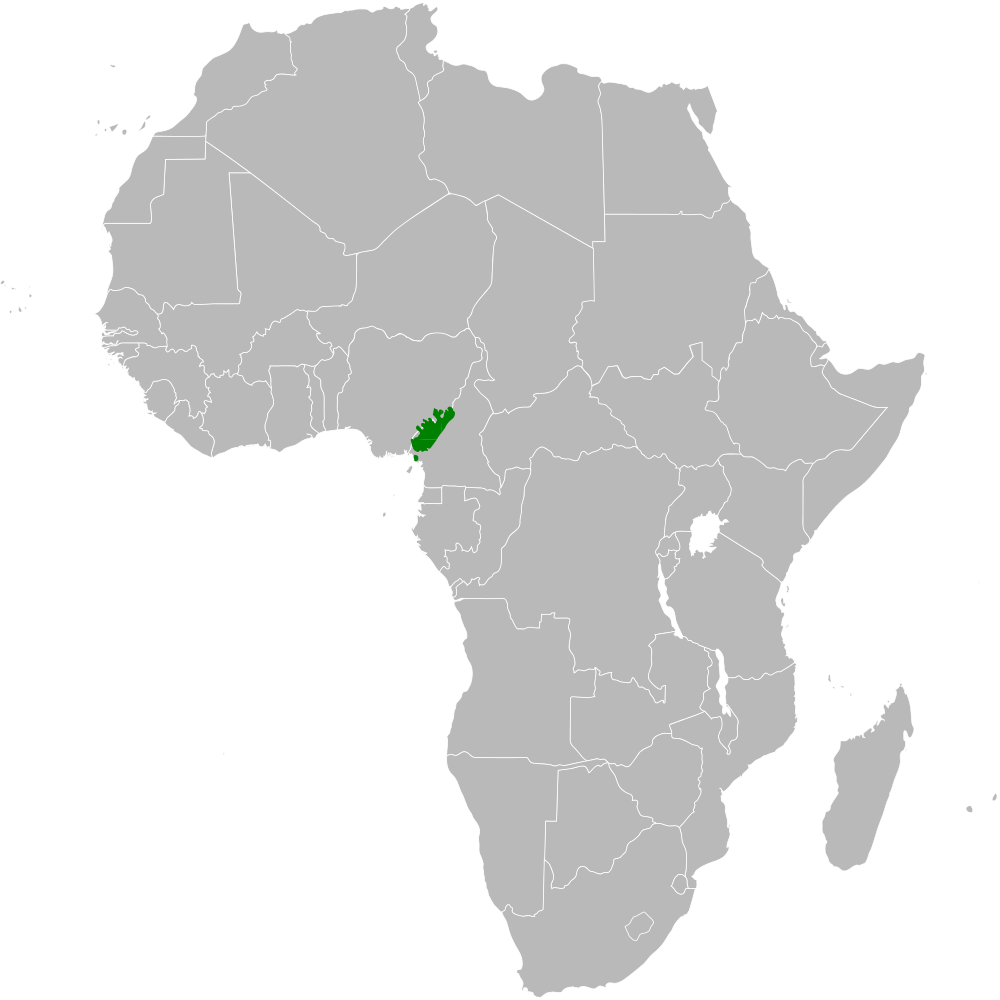

Synonyms
- Andropadus concolor; Andropadus montanus; Arizelocichla montanus; Pycnonotus montanus

= Cameroon mountain greenbul =

Species of bird

The Cameroon mountain greenbul (Arizelocichla montana) is a species of the bulbul family of passerine birds. It is found in the Cameroonian Highlands forests. It is suspected to become rarer due to habitat loss, largely from agriculture, although this is not enough to approach the thresholds for Vulnerable status.

== Taxonomy and systematics ==
The Cameroon mountain greenbul was originally described in the genus Andropadus and, was re-classified to the new genus Arizelocichla in 2010. Alternatively, some authorities classify the Cameroon greenbul in the genus Pycnonotus. Alternate names for the Cameroon mountain greenbul include Cameroon little greenbul, Cameroon montane greenbul, montane greenbul and mountain little greenbul. The alternate names mountain bulbul and mountain greenbul should not be confused with the species of the same name (Ixos mcclellandii and Arizelocichla nigriceps respectively).
