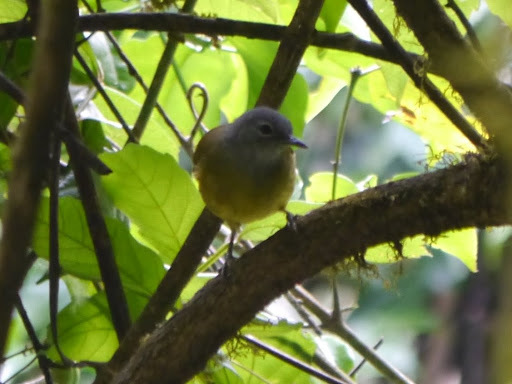

Conservation status
- Least Concern (IUCN 3.1)

Scientific classification
- Kingdom: Animalia
- Phylum: Chordata
- Class: Aves
- Order: Passeriformes
- Family: Pycnonotidae
- Genus: Arizelocichla
- Species: A. tephrolaema

Binomial name
- Arizelocichla tephrolaema (GR Gray, 1862)
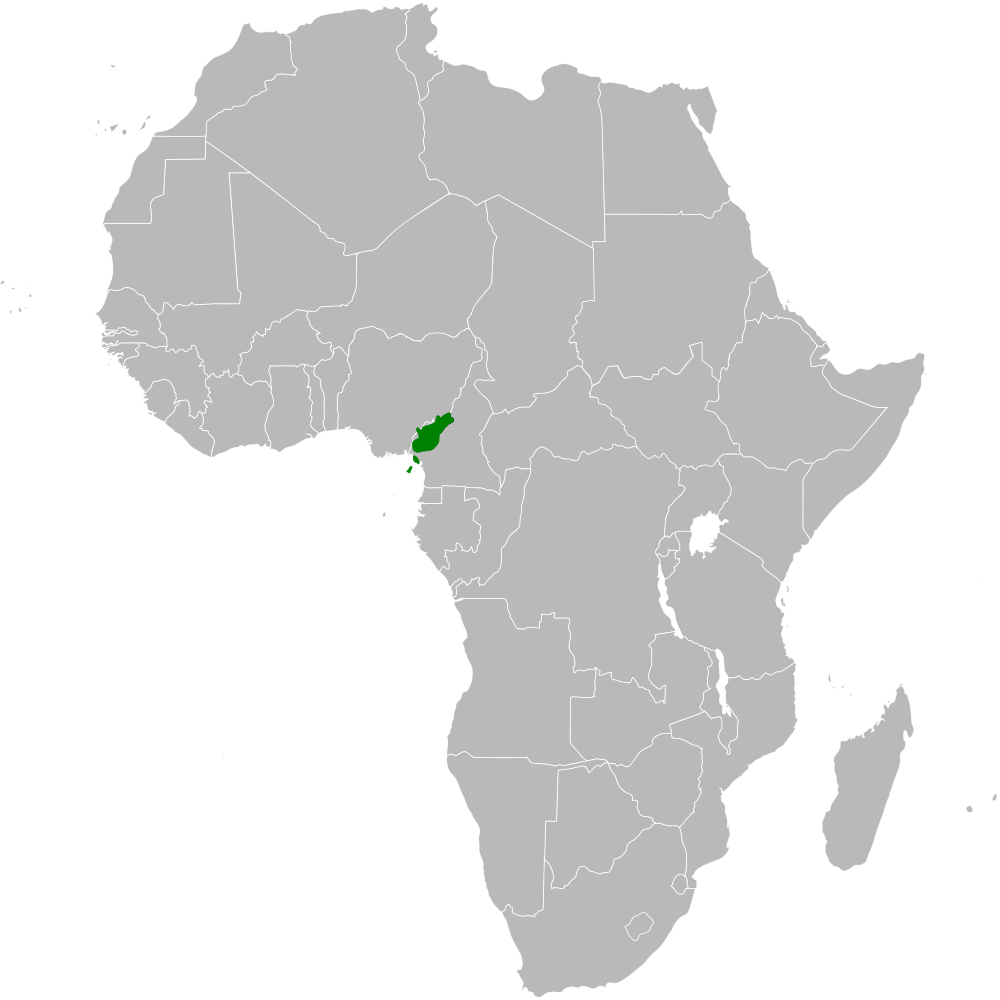

Synonyms
- Andropadus tephrolaemus; Arizelocichla tephrolaemus; Pycnonotus tephrolaemus; Trichophorus tephrolaemus

= Western greenbul =

Species of bird

The western greenbul (Arizelocichla tephrolaema) is a species of the bulbul family of passerine birds. It is found in the Cameroonian Highlands forests.

== Taxonomy and systematics ==
The western greenbul was originally described in the genus Trichophorus (a synonym for Criniger) and then classified in Andropadus before being re-classified to the new genus Arizelocichla in 2010. Alternatively, some authorities classify the Western greenbul in the genus Pycnonotus. Some authorities also consider the olive-breasted and Uluguru greenbul to be subspecies of the western greenbul. Alternate names for the western greenbul include the grey-throated bulbul, grey-throated greenbul, olive-breasted mountain greenbul and western mountain greenbul. The alternate name mountain greenbul should not be confused with the species of the same name, Arizelocichla nigriceps. The alternate name 'western mountain greenbul' is also used by the olive-breasted greenbul and the alternate name 'grey-throated bulbul' is also used by the Palawan bulbul.

=== Subspecies ===
Two subspecies are recognized:

- Bamenda grey-throated greenbul (A. t. bamendae) - (Bannerman, 1923): found in the Cameroonian Highlands forests;
- A. t. tephrolaema - (GR Gray, 1862): found in the Mount Cameroon and Bioko montane forests.

== Distribution and habitat ==
It is found on Bioko, in western Cameroon and adjacent Nigeria. Its natural habitats are boreal forests, subtropical or tropical moist montane forests, and subtropical or tropical dry shrubland.
