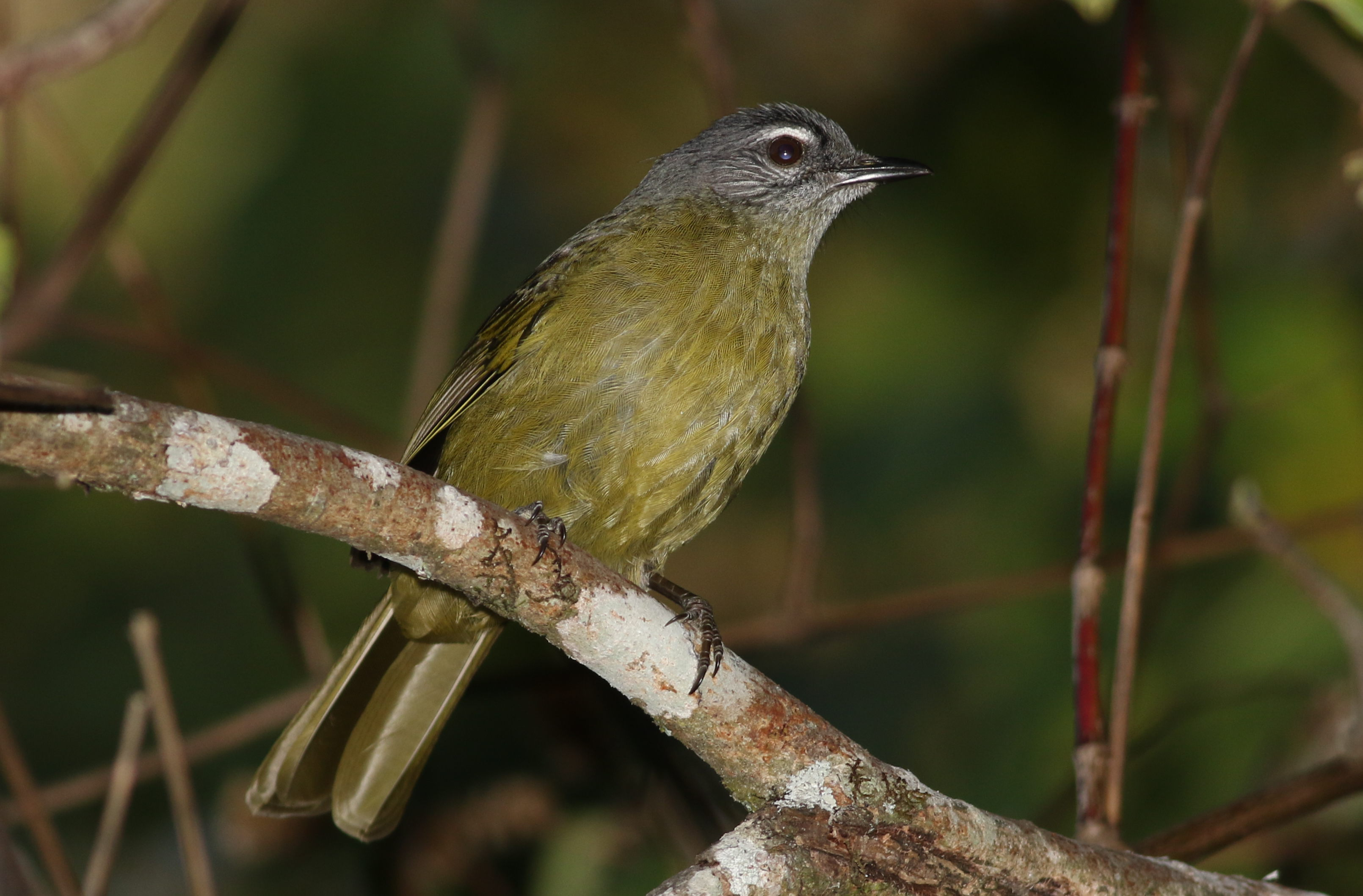
- Nominate subspecies in Zimbabwe

Conservation status
- Near Threatened (IUCN 3.1)

Scientific classification
- Kingdom: Animalia
- Phylum: Chordata
- Class: Aves
- Order: Passeriformes
- Family: Pycnonotidae
- Genus: Arizelocichla
- Species: A. milanjensis

Binomial name
- Arizelocichla milanjensis (Shelley, 1894)

Synonyms
- Andropadus milanjensis; Pycnonotus milanjensis; Xenocichla milanjensis

= Stripe-cheeked greenbul =

Species of bird

The stripe-cheeked greenbul (Arizelocichla milanjensis) is a species of the bulbul family of passerine birds. It is found in south-eastern Africa. Its natural habitat is subtropical or tropical moist montane forests.

== Taxonomy and systematics ==
The stripe-cheeked greenbul was originally described in the genus Xenocichla (a synonym for Bleda), then classified in Andropadus and, in 2010 re-classified to the new genus Arizelocichla. Alternatively, some authorities classify the stripe-cheeked greenbul in the genus Pycnonotus. Some authorities consider the olive-headed greenbul and stripe-faced greenbul to be subspecies of the stripe-cheeked greenbul. Alternate names for the stripe-cheeked greenbul include the Mulanji stripe-cheeked greenbul and stripe-cheeked bulbul.

== Distribution and habitat ==
The stripe-cheeked greenbul is found in the highlands of south-eastern Malawi (Mount Mulanje), extreme eastern Zimbabwe and west-central Mozambique.

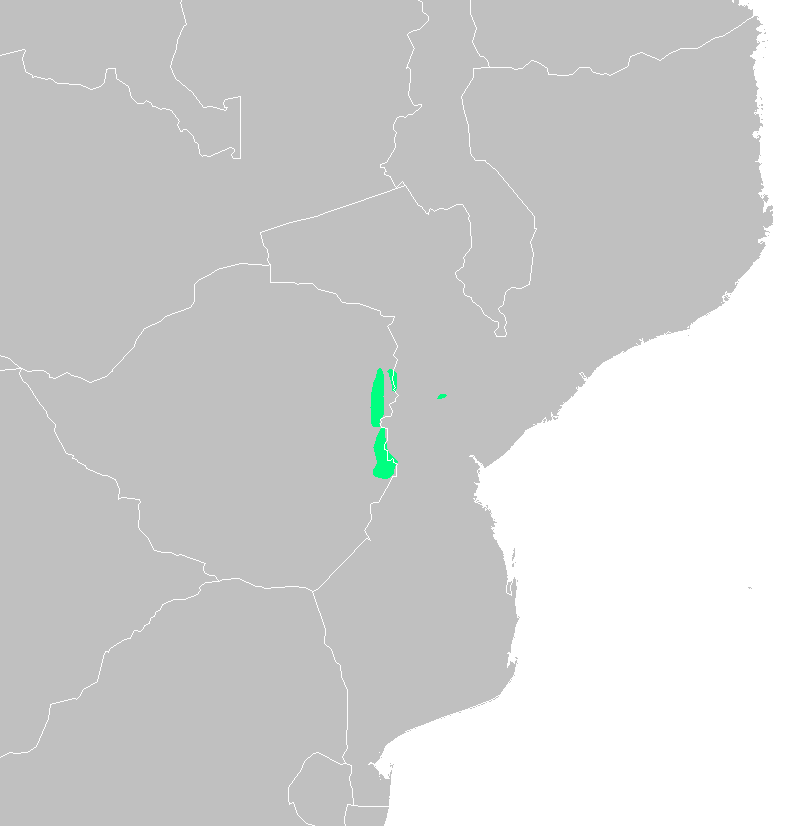
General range of stripe-cheeked greenbul
