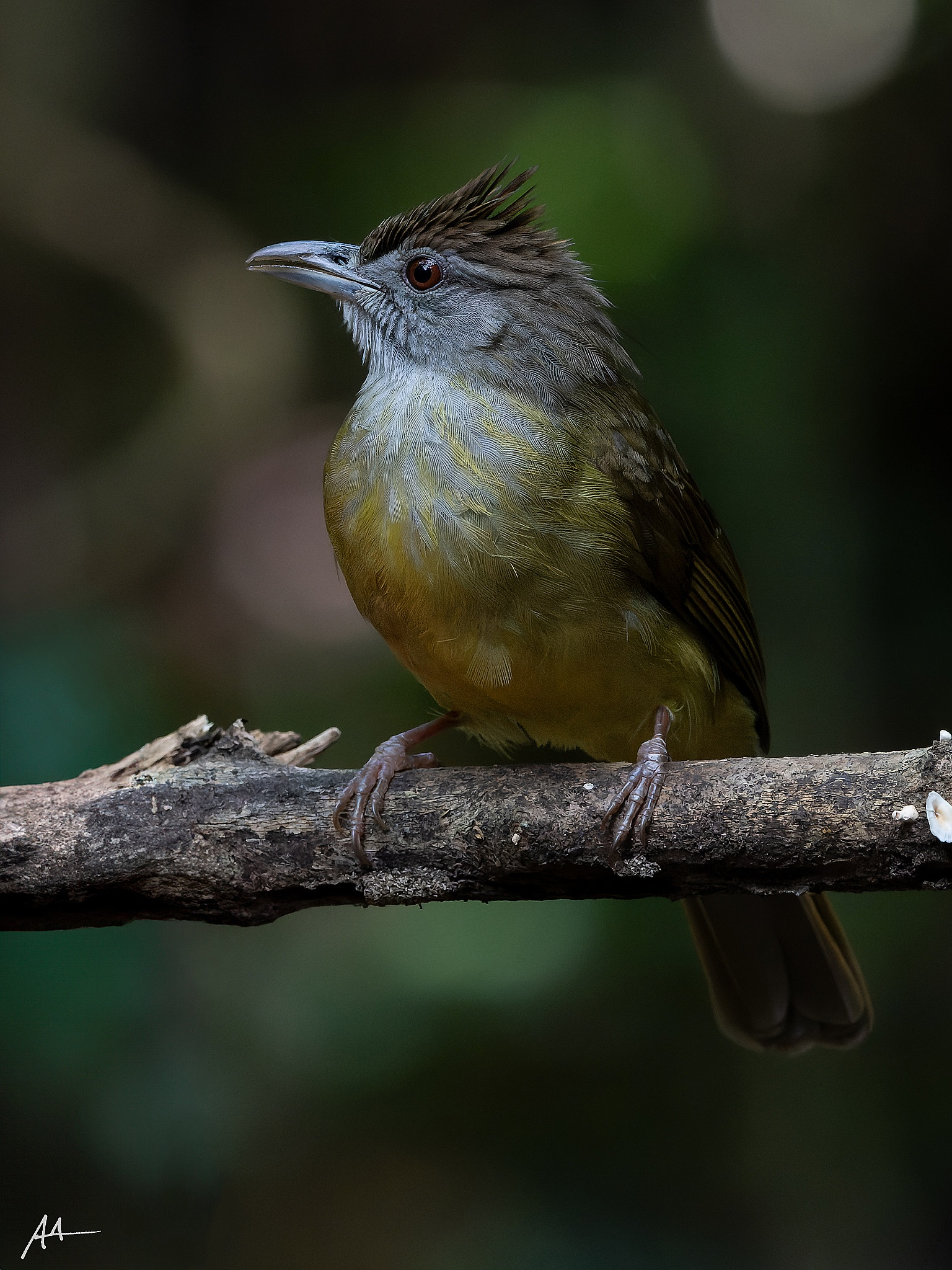

Conservation status
- Least Concern (IUCN 3.1)

Scientific classification
- Kingdom: Animalia
- Phylum: Chordata
- Class: Aves
- Order: Passeriformes
- Family: Pycnonotidae
- Genus: Alophoixus
- Species: A. frater

Binomial name
- Alophoixus frater (Sharpe, 1877)

Synonyms
- Alophoixus bres frater; Criniger bres frater; Criniger frater

= Palawan bulbul =

Species of songbird

The Palawan bulbul or grey-throated bulbul (Alophoixus frater) is a species of songbird in the family Pycnonotidae. It is endemic to Palawan Island in the Philippines. Its natural habitats are tropical moist lowland forests and tropical moist montane forests.

== Description ==
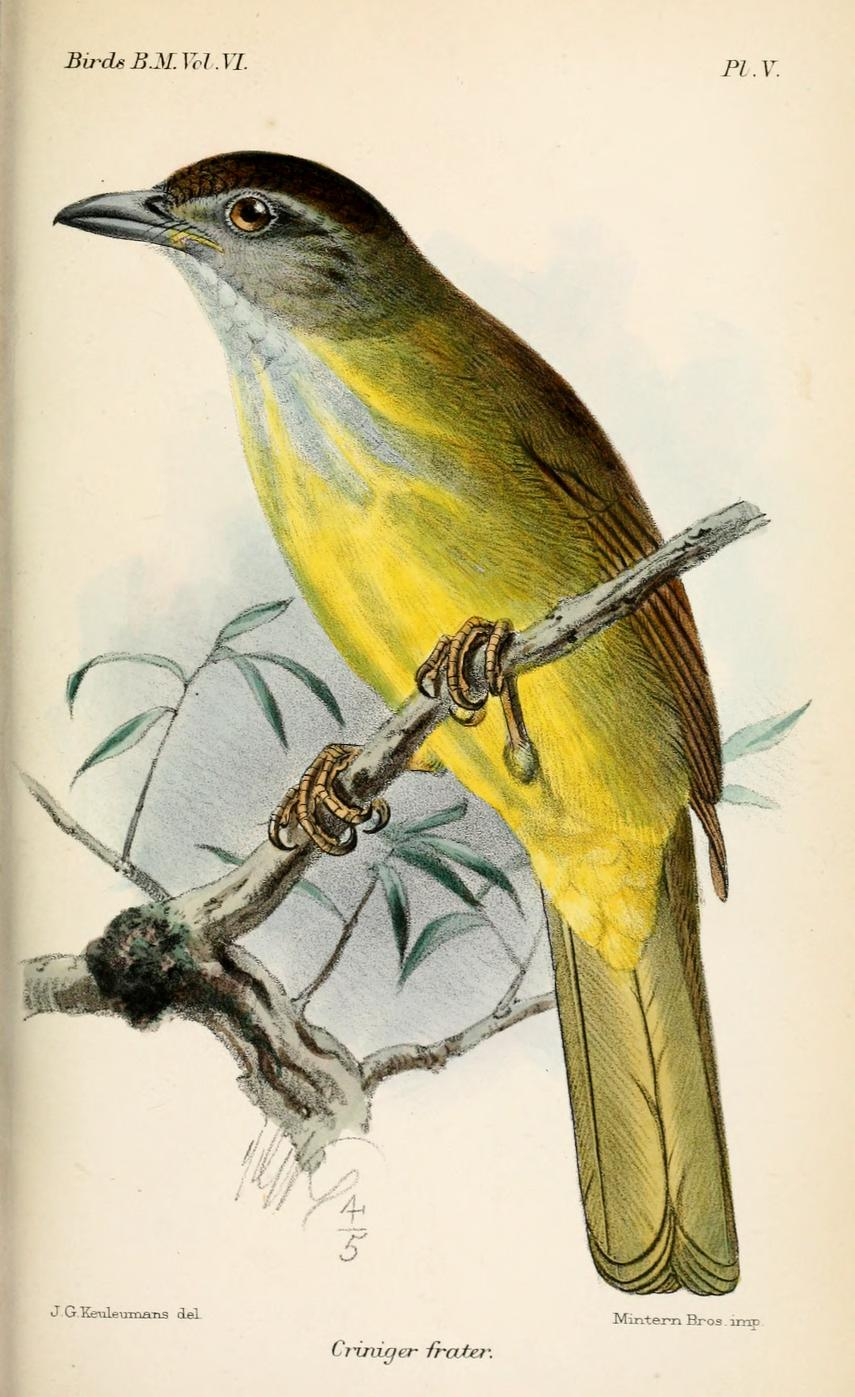
An illustration by Keulemans

Until 2010, it was considered a subspecies of the grey-cheeked bulbul. The alternate name 'grey-throated bulbul' is also used by the western greenbul.

== Ecology and behavior ==
No published information on its diet but has been observed and photographed feeding on fruit and berries Typically observed alone or in pairs.

Birds collected in breeding condition with enlarged gonads in April to June. Nest and eggs are undescribed.

== Habitat and conservation status ==
The species inhabits tropical moist lowland primary forest and secondary forest up to 1,150 meters above sea level.

It is assessed as least-concern under the IUCN. The whole of Palawan was designated as a Biosphere Reserve; however, protection and enforcement of laws has been difficult and these threats still continue. It occurs in the protected area of Puerto Princesa Subterranean River National Park.
