= Western mountain greenbul =

Western mountain greenbul may refer to several species of birds, including:

- Olive-breasted greenbul, found in eastern and central Africa
- Western greenbul, found in west-central Africa
