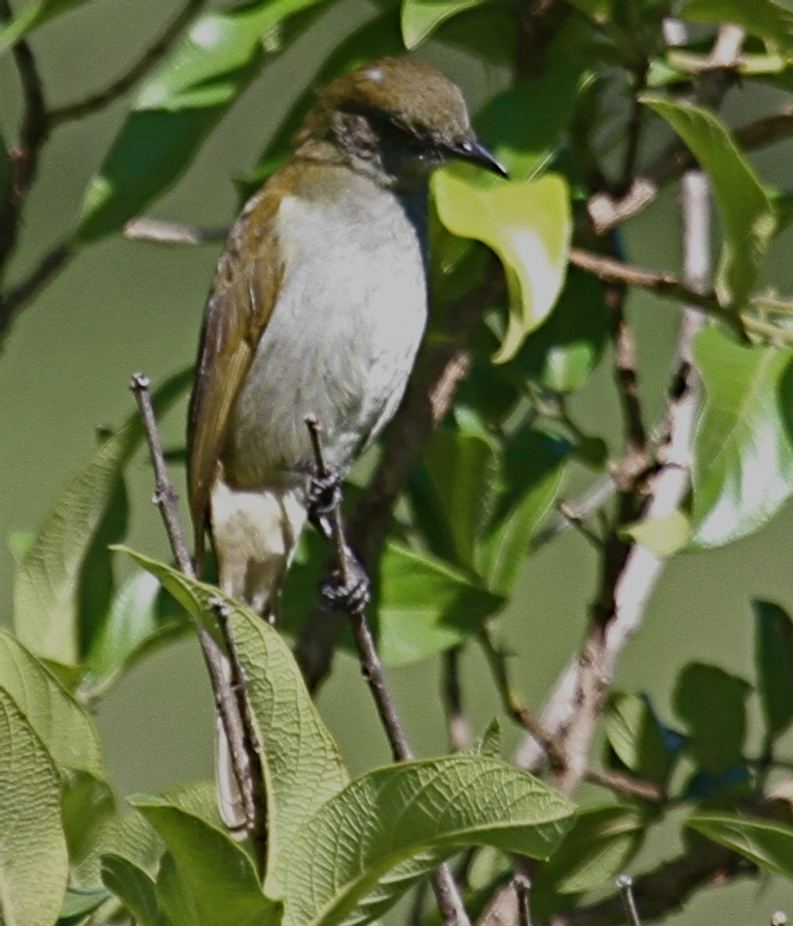
- In Maasai Mara, Kenya

Conservation status
- Least Concern (IUCN 3.1)

Scientific classification
- Kingdom: Animalia
- Phylum: Chordata
- Class: Aves
- Order: Passeriformes
- Family: Pycnonotidae
- Genus: Stelgidillas; Oberholser, 1899
- Species: S. gracilirostris

Binomial name
- Stelgidillas gracilirostris (Strickland, 1844)
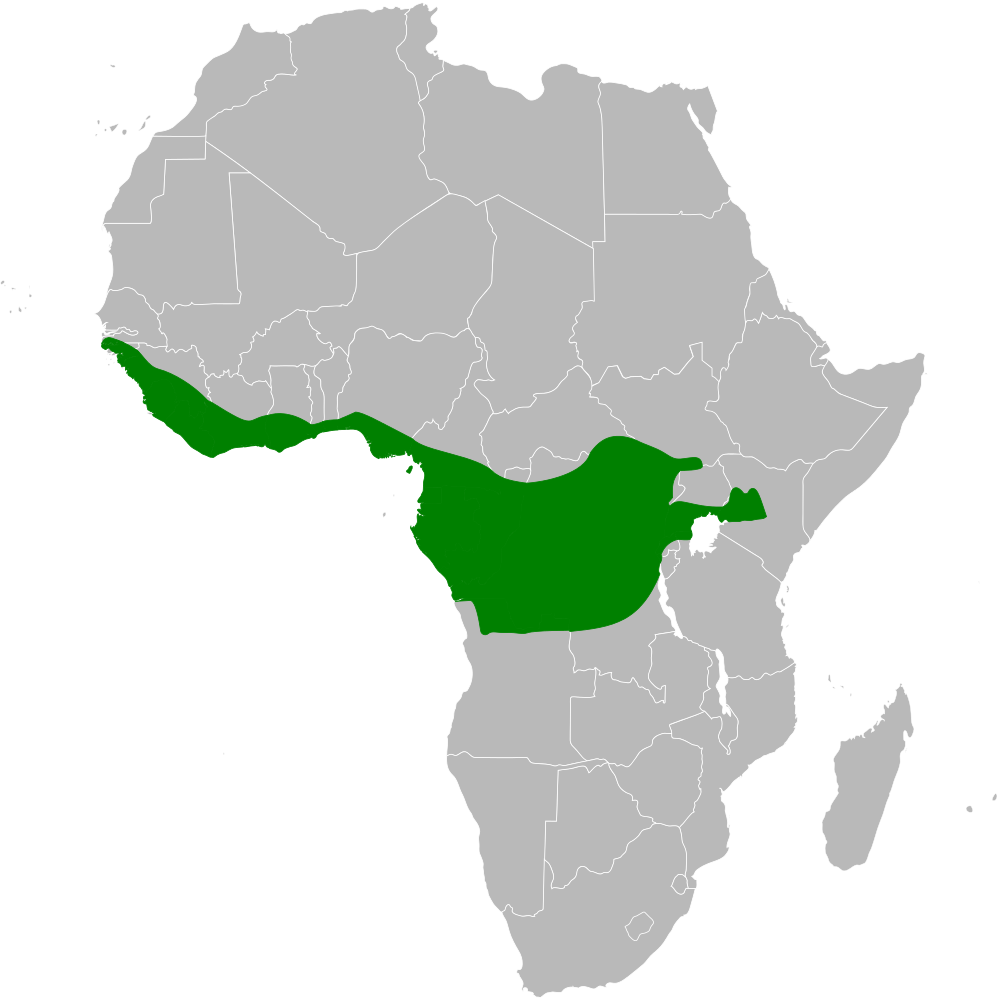

Synonyms
- Andropadus gracilirostris; Pycnonotus gracilirostri; Pycnonotus gracilirostris

= Slender-billed greenbul =

Species of bird

The slender-billed greenbul (Stelgidillas gracilirostris) is a species in the monotypic genus Stelgidillas of the bulbul family of passerine birds. It is found in western and central Africa. Its natural habitats are subtropical or tropical dry forest, subtropical or tropical moist lowland forest, and subtropical or tropical moist montane forest.

== Taxonomy and systematics ==
The slender-billed greenbul was formally described in 1844 by the English naturalist Hugh Edwin Strickland under the binomial name Andropadus gracilirostris from a specimen collected on the island of Fernando Pó (now Bioko) off the west coast of Africa.

A molecular phylogenetic study of the bulbuls published in 2007 found that Andropadus was non-monophyletic. In the subsequent rearrangement to create monophyletic genera, the slender-billed greenbul was moved to the genus Stelgidillas that had been introduced by Harry C. Oberholser in 1899.

=== Former species ===
Formerly, some authorities also considered the following species (or subspecies) as species within the genus Stelgidillas:

- Toro olive greenbul (as Stelgidillas hypochloris)

=== Subspecies ===
Two subspecies of the slender-billed greenbul are recognized:

- Congo slender-billed greenbul (S. g. gracilirostris) - Strickland, 1844 — from Senegal and Guinea-Bissau to southern Sudan, western Kenya, western Tanzania, south-central Democratic Republic Congo and north-western Angola
- Kikuyu slender-billed greenbul (S. g. percivali) - (Neumann, 1903) — central Kenya
