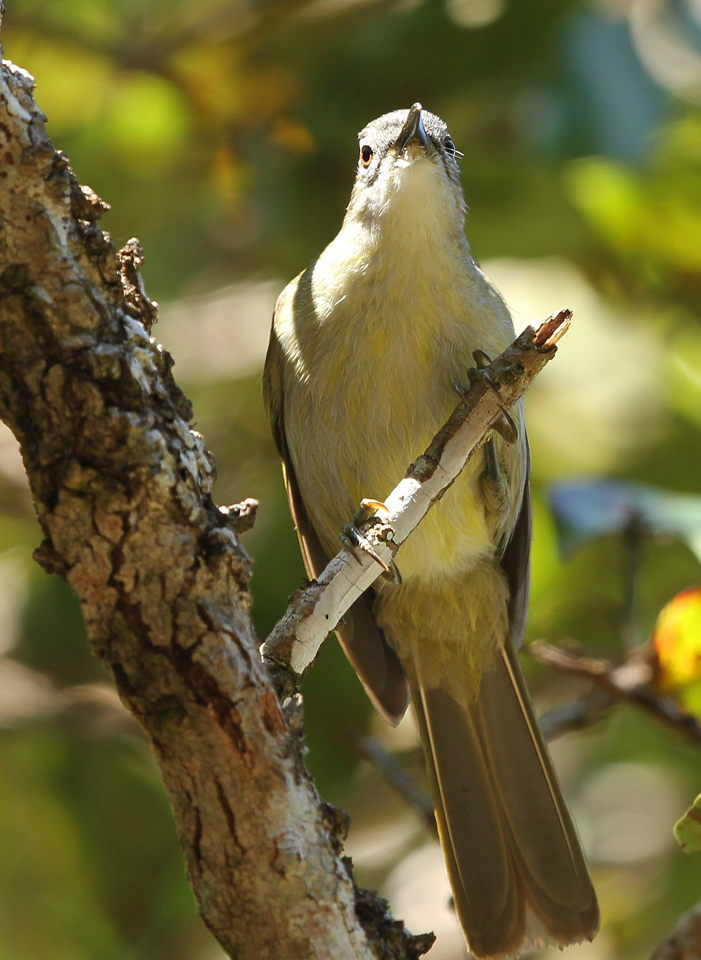
- In Limpopo, South Africa

Conservation status
- Least Concern (IUCN 3.1)

Scientific classification
- Kingdom: Animalia
- Phylum: Chordata
- Class: Aves
- Order: Passeriformes
- Family: Pycnonotidae
- Genus: Phyllastrephus
- Species: P. flavostriatus

Binomial name
- Phyllastrephus flavostriatus (Sharpe, 1876)
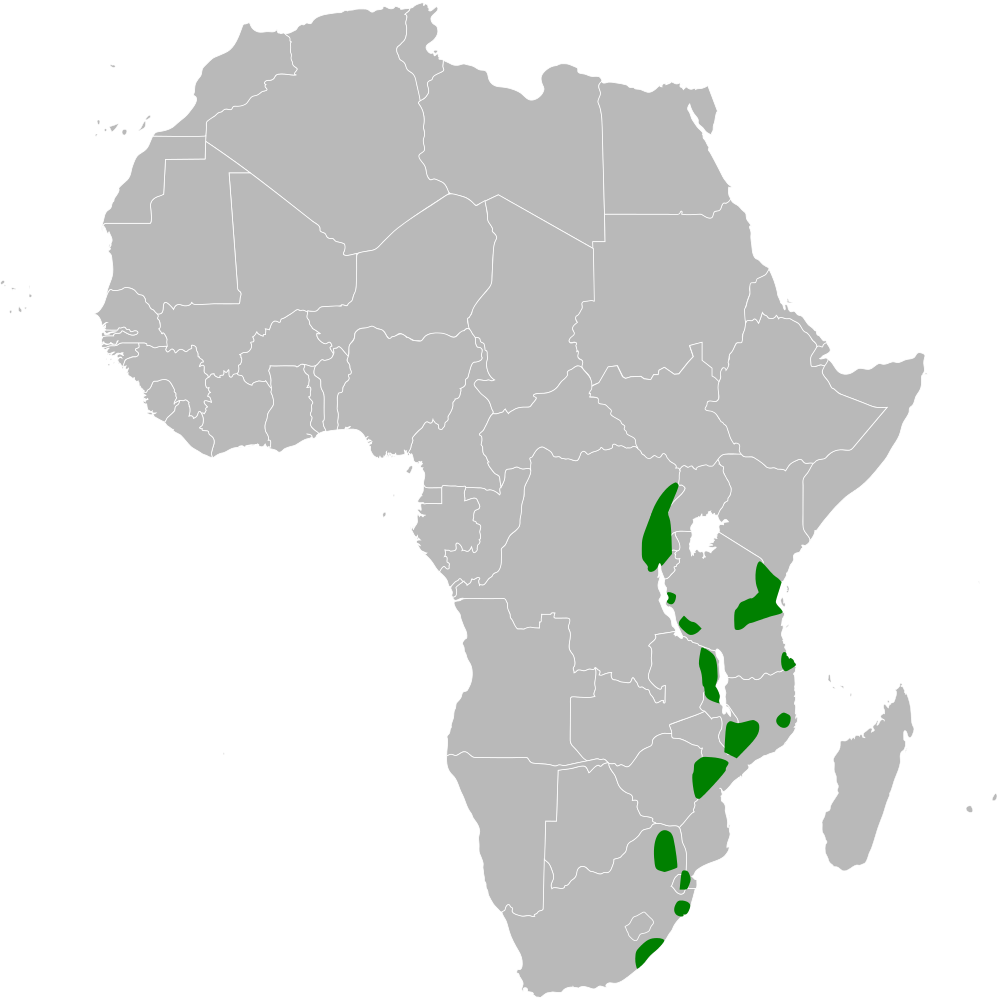

Synonyms
- Andropadus flavostriatus; Phyllastrephus olivaceo-griseus

= Yellow-streaked greenbul =

Species of songbird

The yellow-streaked greenbul or yellow-streaked bulbul (Phyllastrephus flavostriatus) is a species of songbird in the bulbul family, Pycnonotidae. It is found in eastern and south-eastern Africa. Its natural habitats are subtropical or tropical moist lowland forest and subtropical or tropical moist montane forest.

== Taxonomy and systematics ==
The yellow-streaked greenbul was originally described in the genus Andropadus. Additionally, some authorities have considered Sharpe's greenbul to also be a subspecies of the yellow-streaked greenbul. Alternate names for the yellow-streaked greenbul include the yellow-streaked bulbul and yellow-bellied greenbul.

=== Subspecies ===
Seven subspecies are recognized:

- P. f. graueri – Neumann, 1908: Originally described as a separate species. Found in the highlands near Lake Albert, Lake Edward and Lake Kivu (eastern and north-eastern Democratic Republic of Congo)
- Kivu olive greenbul (P. f. olivaceogriseus) – Reichenow, 1908: Originally described as a separate species. Found in the Rwenzori Mountains, Itombwe Mountains and Mt. Kabobo (eastern Democratic Republic of Congo), western Uganda, western Rwanda and northern Burundi
- P. f. kungwensis – Moreau, 1941: Found in western Tanzania
- P. f. uzungwensis – Jensen & Stuart, 1982: Found in the Udzungwa Mountains (eastern Tanzania)
- P. f. tenuirostris – (Fischer, GA & Reichenow, 1884): Originally described in the genus Xenocichla (a synonym for Bleda). Found in south-eastern Kenya, eastern Tanzania and north-eastern Mozambique
- P. f. vincenti – Grant, CHB & Mackworth-Praed, 1940: Found in south-eastern Malawi and western Mozambique
- South African yellow-streaked greenbul (P. f. flavostriatus) – (Sharpe, 1876): Originally described in the genus Andropadus. Found in eastern Zimbabwe, southern Mozambique and eastern South Africa
