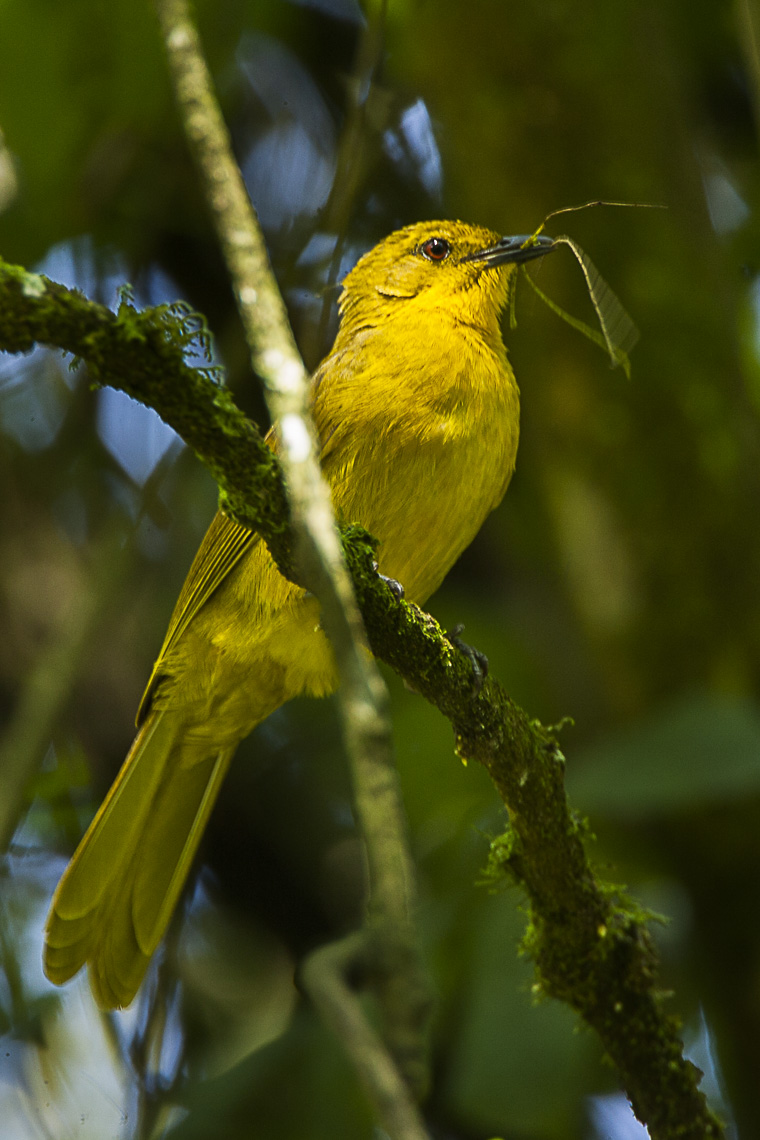

Conservation status
- Least Concern (IUCN 3.1)

Scientific classification
- Kingdom: Animalia
- Phylum: Chordata
- Class: Aves
- Order: Passeriformes
- Family: Pycnonotidae
- Genus: Chlorocichla
- Species: C. laetissima

Binomial name
- Chlorocichla laetissima (Sharpe, 1899)
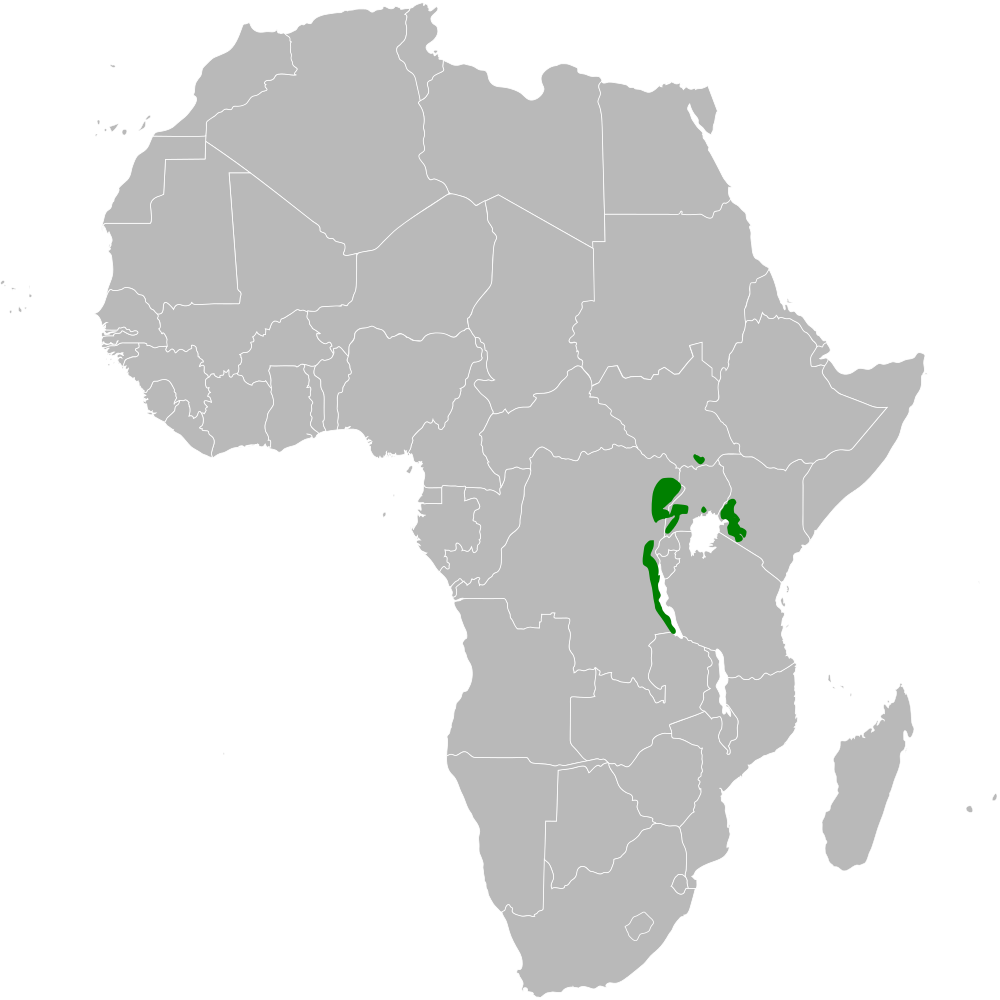

Synonyms
- Andropadus laetissimus

Audio
- Joyful greenbul song, recorded in Kitale, Kenya

= Joyful greenbul =

Species of songbird

The joyful greenbul (Chlorocichla laetissima) or joyful bulbul, is a species of songbird in the bulbul family, Pycnonotidae. It is found in east-central Africa. Its natural habitats are boreal forests and subtropical or tropical moist montane forests.

== Taxonomy and systematics ==
The joyful greenbul was originally described in the genus Andropadus and later re-classified within Chlorocichla.

=== Subspecies ===
Two subspecies of the joyful greenbul are recognized:

- Chlorocichla laetissima laetissima - (Sharpe, 1899): Imatong Mountains, East African and northern Albertine rift montane forests
- Chlorocichla laetissima schoutedeni - Prigogine, 1954: southern Albertine rift montane forests
