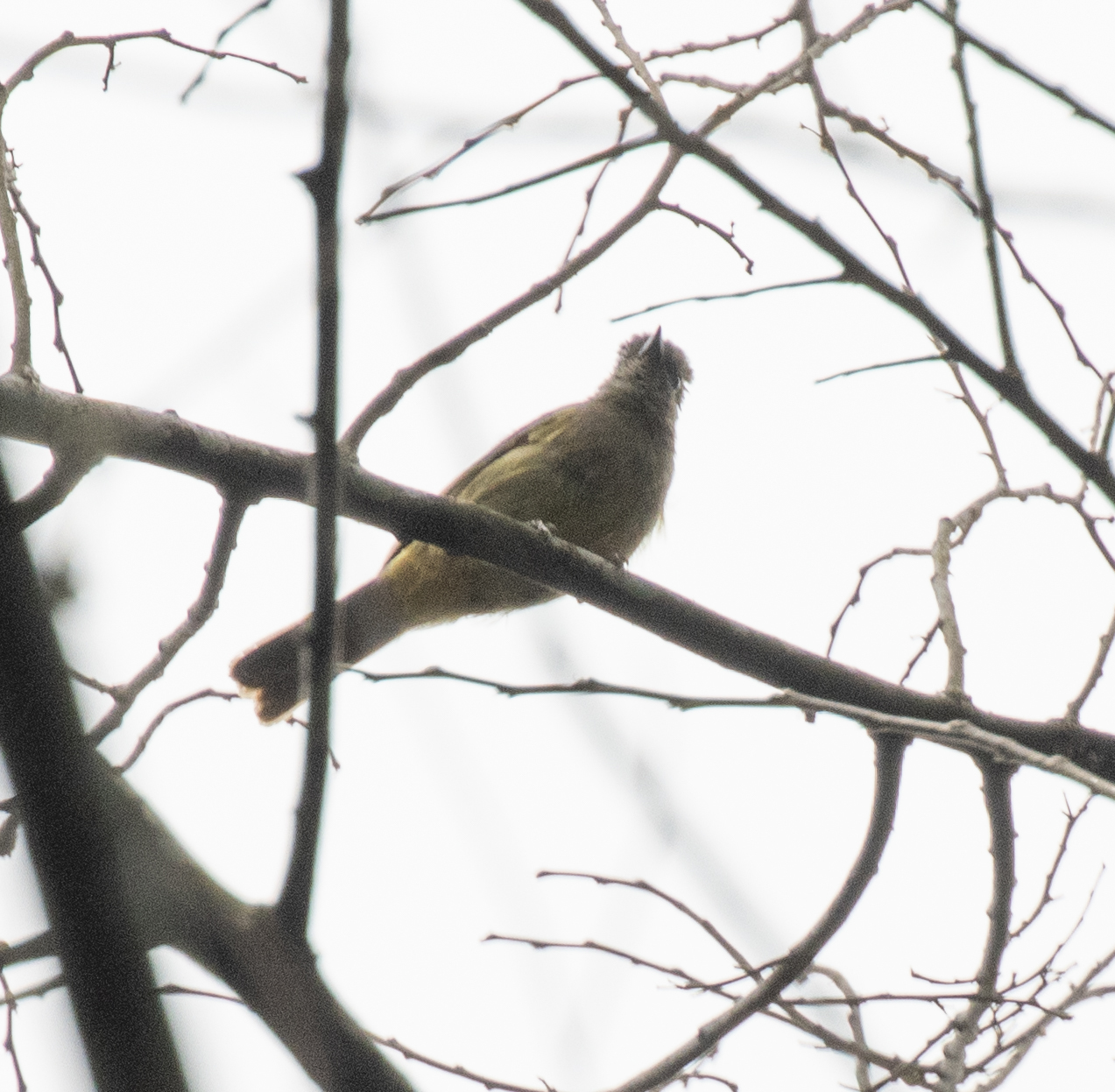

Conservation status
- Least Concern (IUCN 3.1)

Scientific classification
- Kingdom: Animalia
- Phylum: Chordata
- Class: Aves
- Order: Passeriformes
- Family: Pycnonotidae
- Genus: Phyllastrephus
- Species: P. hypochloris

Binomial name
- Phyllastrephus hypochloris (Jackson, 1906)
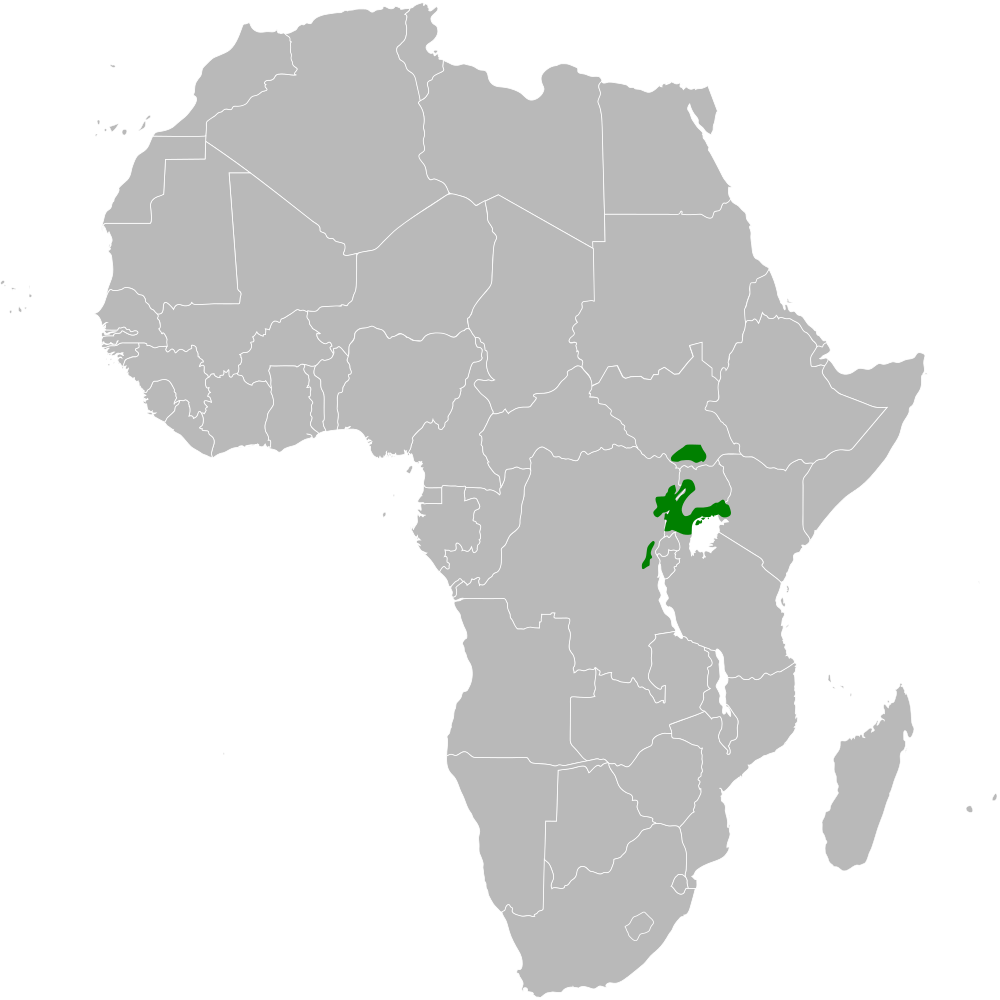

Synonyms
- Phyllastrephus kagerensis; Stelgidillas hypochloris

= Toro olive greenbul =

Species of bird

The Toro olive greenbul (Phyllastrephus hypochloris) is a species of songbird in the bulbul family, Pycnonotidae. It is found in southern South Sudan and from eastern Democratic Republic of the Congo through Uganda to western Kenya and northern Tanzania. Its natural habitat is subtropical or tropical moist lowland forests. The Toro olive greenbul was originally described in the genus Stelgidillas. Alternate names for the Toro olive greenbul include the Toro greenbul and Toro olive bulbul.
