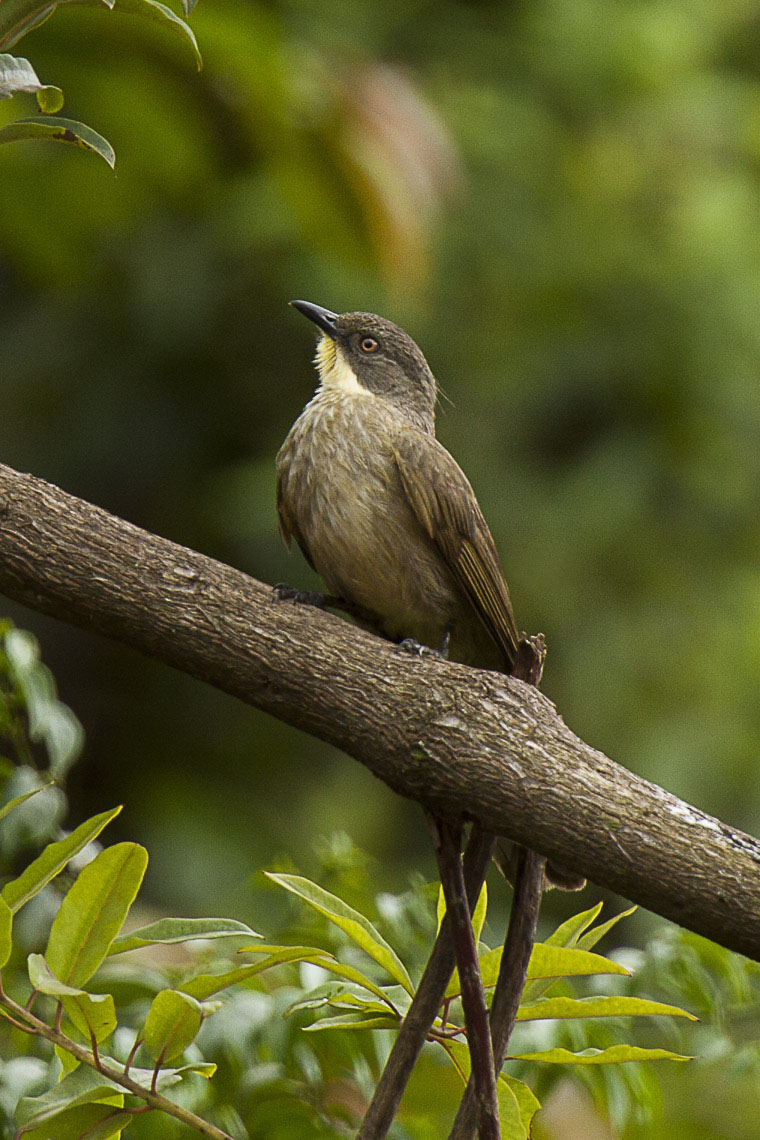

Conservation status
- Least Concern (IUCN 3.1)

Scientific classification
- Kingdom: Animalia
- Phylum: Chordata
- Class: Aves
- Order: Passeriformes
- Family: Pycnonotidae
- Genus: Arizelocichla
- Species: A. chlorigula

Binomial name
- Arizelocichla chlorigula (Reichenow, 1899)

Synonyms
- Andropadus chlorigula; Andropadus nigriceps chlorigula; Arizelocichla fusciceps chlorigula; Arizelocichla nigriceps chlorigula; Pycnonotus chlorigula; Pycnonotus nigriceps chlorigula; Pycnonotus tephrolaemus chlorigula; Xenocichla chlorigula

= Yellow-throated mountain greenbul =

Species of bird

The yellow-throated mountain greenbul (Arizelocichla chlorigula), also known as the yellow-throated greenbul, is a species of the bulbul family of passerine birds. It is native to the Eastern Arc Mountains of Tanzania.

== Taxonomy and systematics ==
The yellow-throated mountain greenbul was originally described in the genus Xenocichla (a synonym for Bleda) and then classified in Andropadus. It was re-classified to the new genus Arizelocichla in 2010. Alternatively, some authorities classify the yellow-throated greenbul in the genus Pycnonotus. Some authorities have considered the yellow-throated mountain greenbul to be a subspecies of the black-headed mountain greenbul. Alternate names for the yellow-throated mountain greenbul include the green-throated greenbul, southern mountain greenbul and yellow-throated greenbul. The name 'yellow-throated greenbul' is also used as an alternate name for the yellow-throated leaflove and Falkenstein's greenbul, while the alternate name 'green-throated greenbul' is also used by the olive-headed greenbul. Some authorities consider the yellow-throated greenbul to be synonymous with the yellow-throated leaflove.
