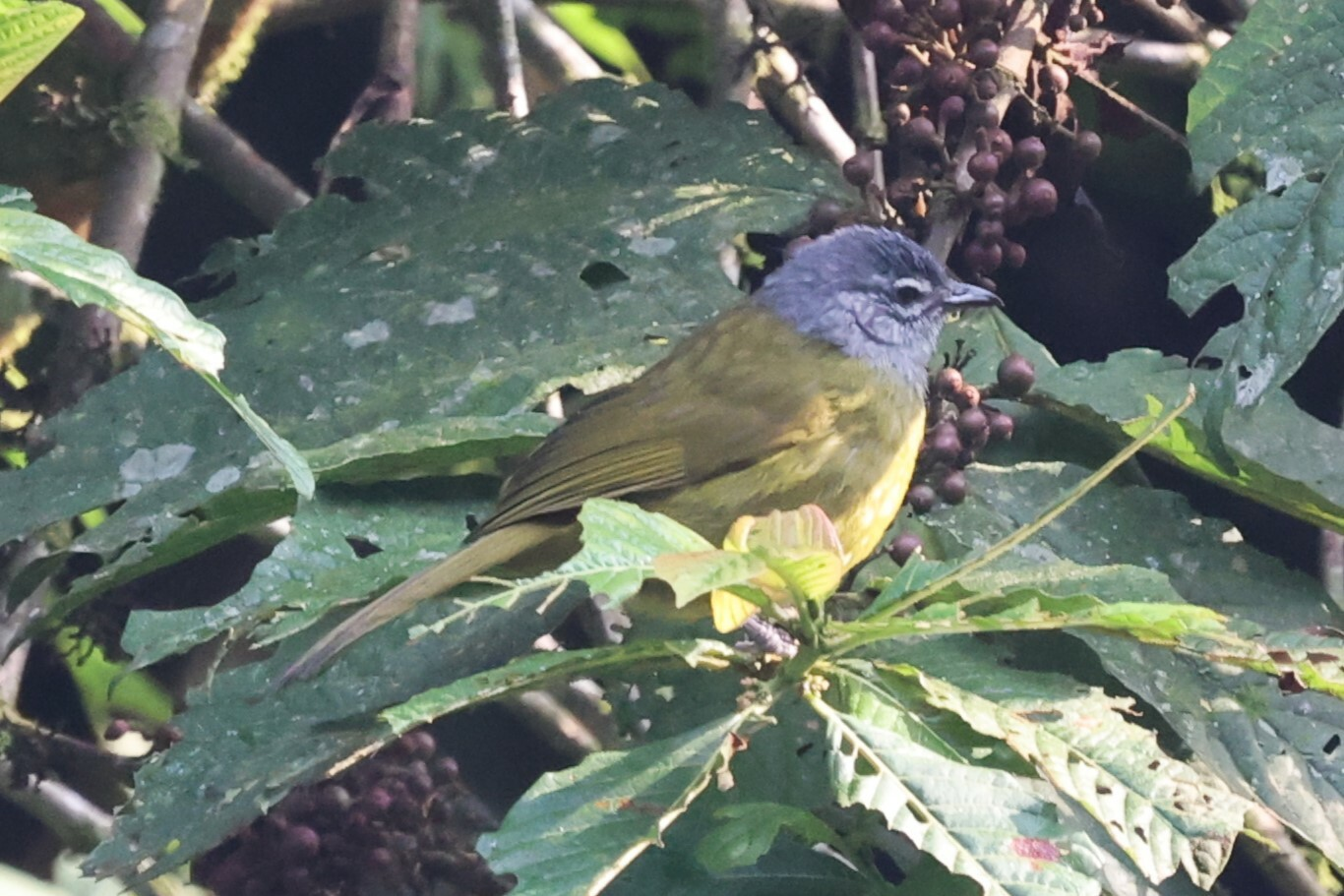

Scientific classification
- Kingdom: Animalia
- Phylum: Chordata
- Class: Aves
- Order: Passeriformes
- Family: Pycnonotidae
- Genus: Arizelocichla
- Species: A. kikuyuensis

Binomial name
- Arizelocichla kikuyuensis (Sharpe, 1891)

Synonyms
- Andropadus kikuyensis; Andropadus kikuyuensis; Andropadus nigriceps kikuyensis; Andropadus nigriceps kikuyuensis; Andropadus nigriceps schubotzi; Andropadus nigriceps usambarae; Andropadus tephrolaemus kikuyensis; Andropadus tephrolaemus kikuyuensis; Arizelocichla nigriceps kikuyuensis; Pycnonotus nigriceps kikuyuensis; Pycnonotus tephrolaemus kikuyensis; Pycnonotus tephrolaemus kikuyuensis; Xenocichla kikuyuensis

= Kikuyu mountain greenbul =

Species of bird

The Kikuyu mountain greenbul (Arizelocichla kikuyuensis), also known as the olive-breasted greenbul, is a species of the bulbul family of passerine birds. It is native to the Lake Victoria region.

== Taxonomy and systematics ==
The Kikuyu mountain greenbul was originally described in the genus Xenocichla (a synonym for Bleda), then classified in Andropadus and, in 2010 re-classified to the new genus Arizelocichla. Also, some authorities consider the olive-breasted greenbul to be a subspecies of western mountain greenbul or the mountain greenbul. Alternate names for the olive-breasted greenbul include the Kikuyu grey-throated greenbul and western mountain greenbul. The alternate name 'western mountain greenbul' is also used by the western greenbul. The English name and the specific epithet are from the name of the Kikuyu people that live in Kenya.
