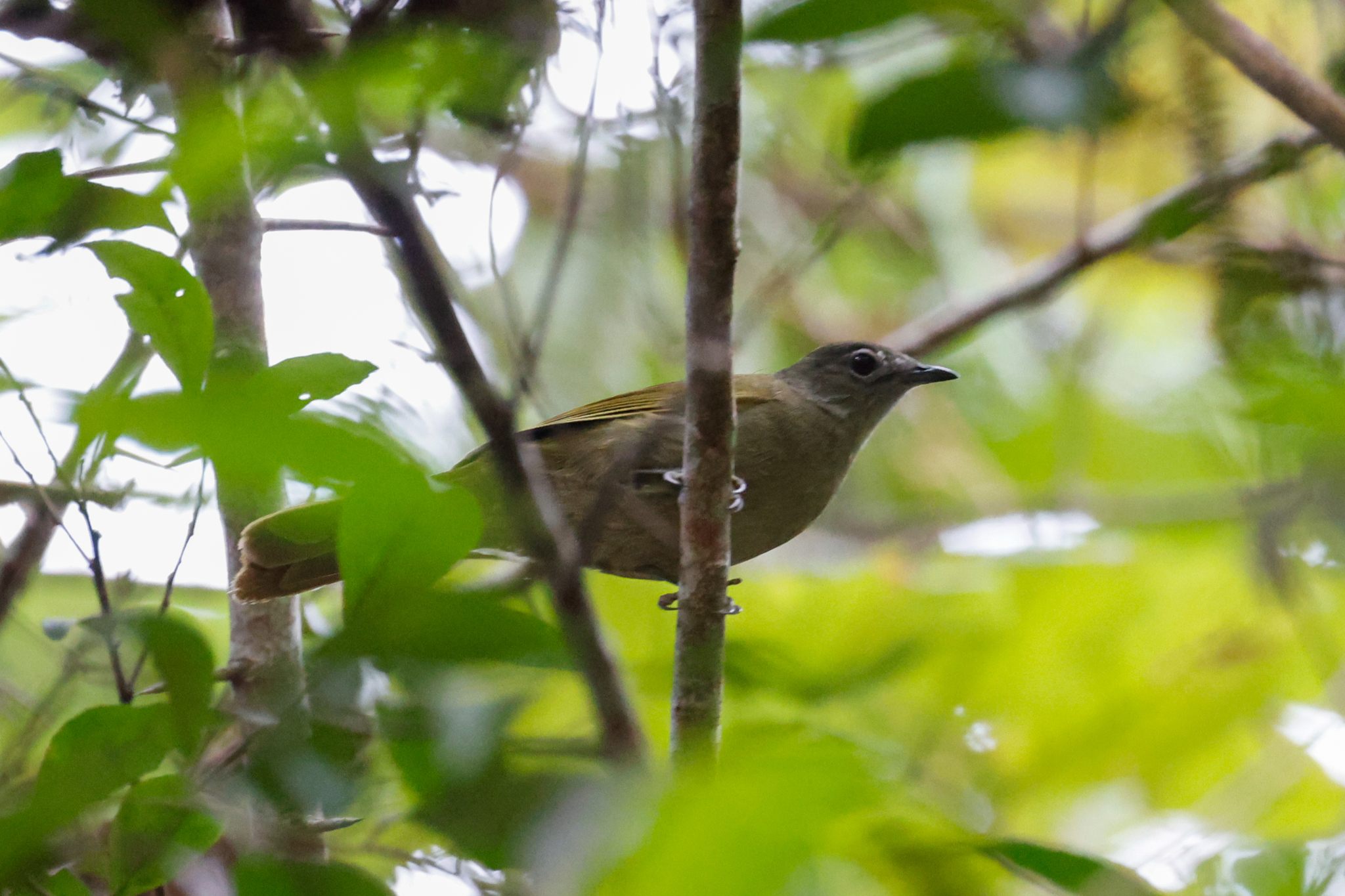

Conservation status
- Least Concern (IUCN 3.1)

Scientific classification
- Kingdom: Animalia
- Phylum: Chordata
- Class: Aves
- Order: Passeriformes
- Family: Pycnonotidae
- Genus: Arizelocichla
- Species: A. masukuensis

Binomial name
- Arizelocichla masukuensis (Shelley, 1897)
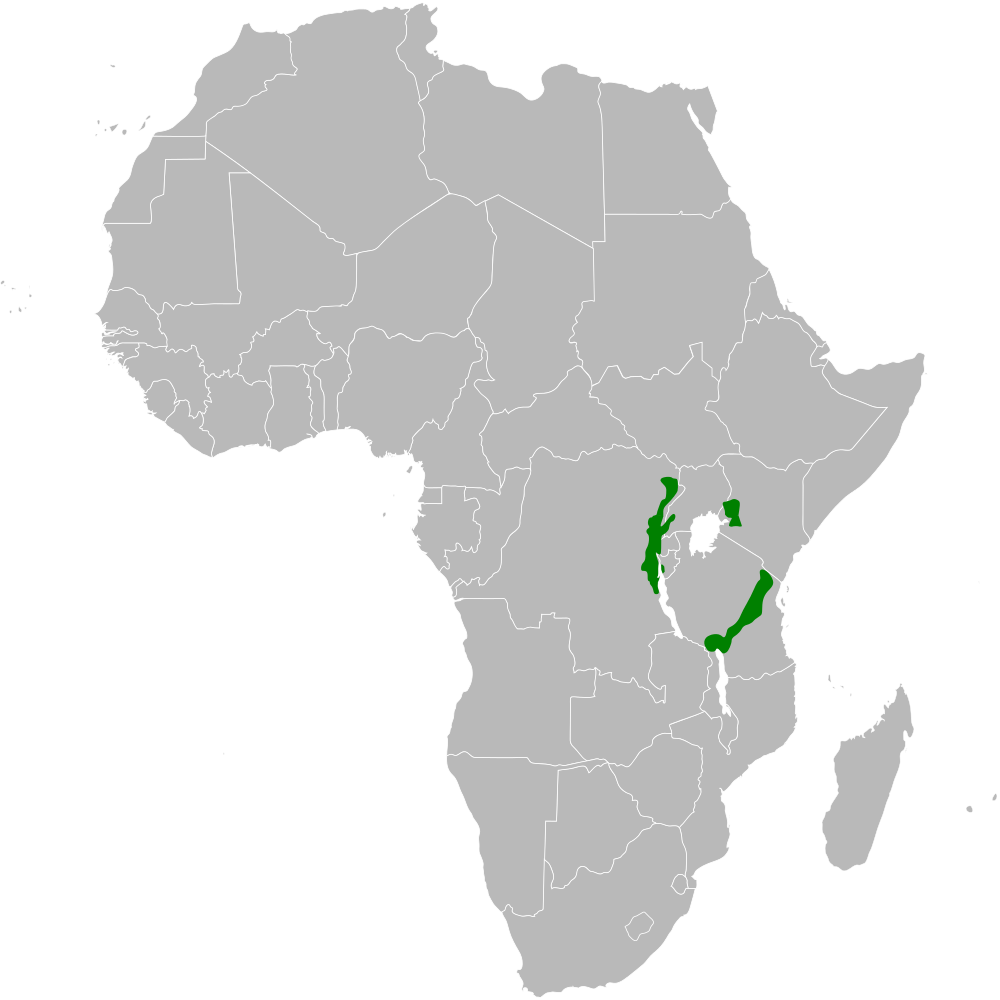
- Range

Synonyms
- Andropadus masukuensis; Pycnonotus masukuensis

= Shelley's greenbul =

Species of bird

Shelley's greenbul (Arizelocichla masukuensis) or Shelley's bulbul, is a species of the bulbul family of passerine birds. It is found in east-central Africa. Its natural habitats are subtropical or tropical dry forests and subtropical or tropical moist montane forests.

== Taxonomy ==
Shelley's greenbul was formally described in 1897 by the English ornithologist George Ernest Shelley based on specimens collected by the naturalist Alexander Whyte in the Misuku Hills of northern Malawi. Shelley placed the greenbul in the genus Andropadus and coined the binomial name Andropadus masukuensis where the specific epithet is from the type locality. Shelley's greenbul is now one of ten species placed in the genus Arizelocichla that was introduced in 1905 by the American ornithologist Harry C. Oberholser.

Four subspecies are recognised:

- A. m. kakamegae (Sharpe, RB, 1900) – eastern Democratic Republic of the Congo to Uganda, western Kenya (Kakamega Forest), and western Tanzania
- A. m. kungwensis Moreau, RE, 1941 – western Tanzania (Mount Rungwe or Mount Kungwe area)
- A. m. roehli (Reichenow, A, 1905) – highlands of eastern Tanzania
- A. m. masukuensis (Shelley, GE, 1897) – southwestern Tanzania (Rungwe Mountains) to northern Malawi (Masuku Mountains)

The subspecies A. m. kakamegae and A. m. kungwensis have sometimes been considered as a separate species, the Kakamega greenbul. Although mitochondrial DNA studies have revealed some genetic divergence, the plumage differences are small and the vocal differences have not been studied.
