= Sharpe's greenbul =

Scientific classification
- Kingdom: Animalia
- Phylum: Chordata
- Class: Aves
- Order: Passeriformes
- Family: Pycnonotidae
- Genus: Phyllastrephus
- Species: P. alfredi

Binomial name
- Phyllastrephus alfredi (Shelley, 1903)

Synonyms
- Bleda alfredi; Phyllastrephus flavostriatus alfredi; Phyllastrephus olivaceo-griseus alfredi

Species of songbird

Sharpe's greenbul (Phyllastrephus alfredi) or the Malawi greenbul, is a species of songbird in the bulbul family, Pycnonotidae. It is found in Africa in south-western Tanzania, north-eastern Zambia and northern Malawi.

== Taxonomy and systematics ==
Sharpe's greenbul was originally described in the genus Bleda. Alternatively, some authorities classify it as a subspecies of the yellow-streaked greenbul. Formerly, some authorities have considered Fischer's greenbul as a subspecies of Sharpe's greenbul.
