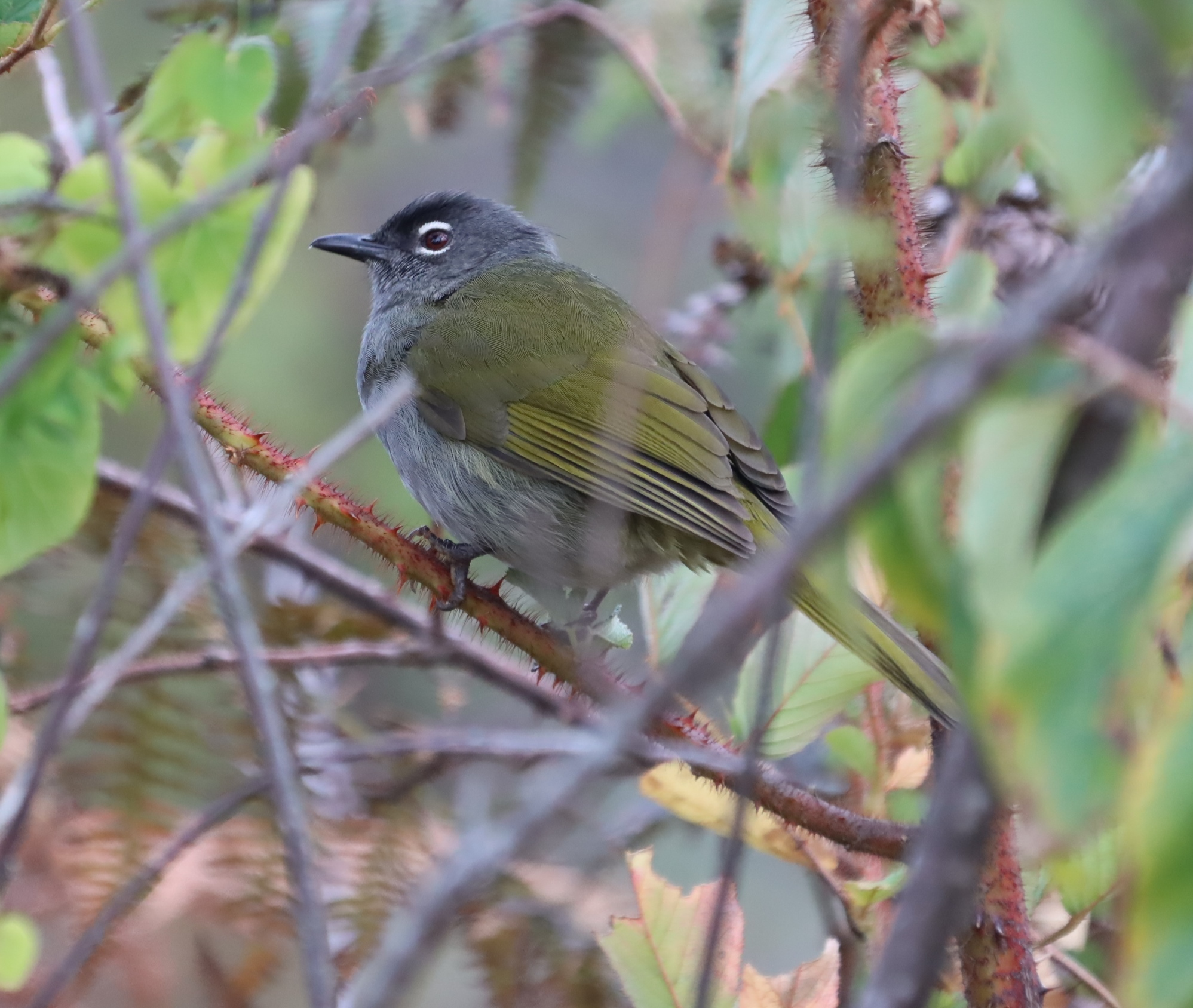

Conservation status
- Least Concern (IUCN 3.1)

Scientific classification
- Kingdom: Animalia
- Phylum: Chordata
- Class: Aves
- Order: Passeriformes
- Family: Pycnonotidae
- Genus: Arizelocichla
- Species: A. fusciceps

Binomial name
- Arizelocichla fusciceps (Shelley, 1893)

Synonyms
- Andropadus fusciceps; Andropadus nigriceps fusciceps; Andropadus tephrolaemus fusciceps; Arizelocichla nigriceps fusciceps; Pycnonotus nigriceps fusciceps; Pycnonotus tephrolaemus fusciceps; Xenocichla fusciceps

= Black-browed mountain greenbul =

Species of bird

The black-browed mountain greenbul (Arizelocichla fusciceps), formerly the black-browed greenbul, is a species of the bulbul family of passerine birds. It is found in south-eastern Africa from south-western Tanzania to north-eastern Zambia, Malawi and west-central Mozambique.

== Taxonomy and systematics ==
The black-browed greenbul was originally described in the genus Xenocichla (a synonym for Bleda) and then classified in Andropadus. It was re-classified to the new genus Arizelocichla in 2010. Some authorities have considered the Uluguru mountain greenbul to be a subspecies of the black-browed greenbul. Alternate names for the black-browed mountain greenbul include the black-browed greenbul, Morogoro yellow-necked greenbul, northern mountain greenbul and southern mountain greenbul.
