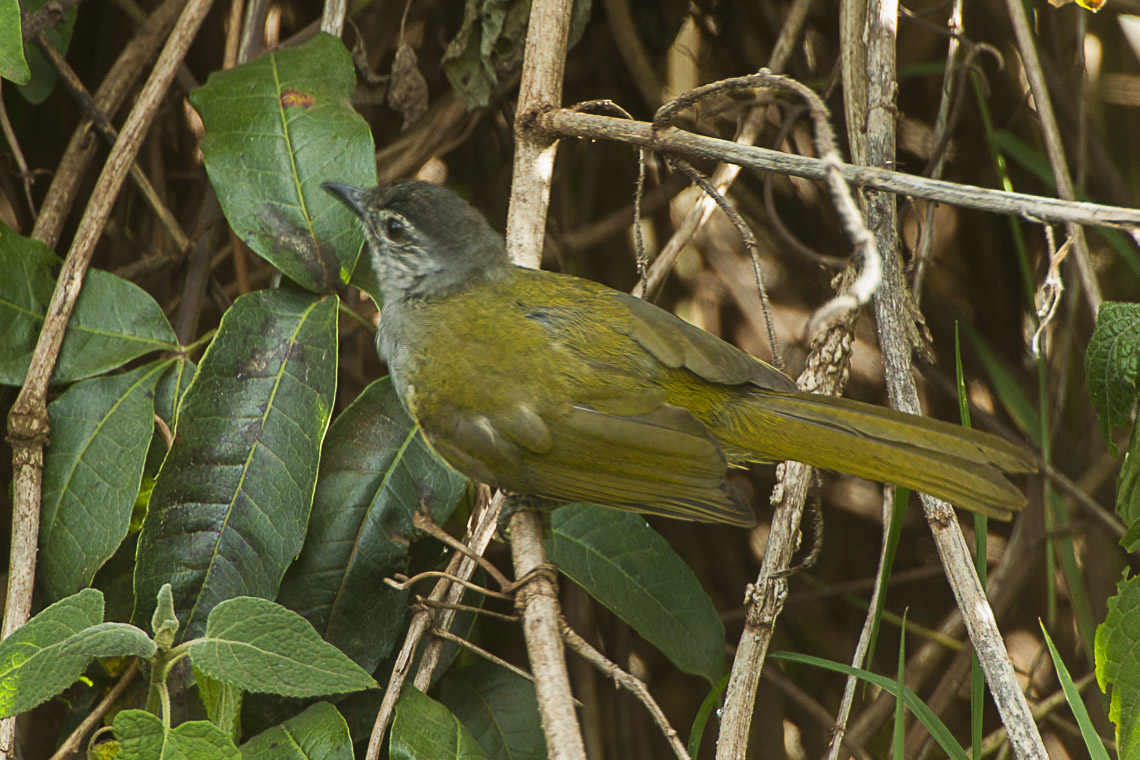

Conservation status
- Least Concern (IUCN 3.1)

Scientific classification
- Kingdom: Animalia
- Phylum: Chordata
- Class: Aves
- Order: Passeriformes
- Family: Pycnonotidae
- Genus: Arizelocichla
- Species: A. nigriceps

Binomial name
- Arizelocichla nigriceps (Shelley, 1889)
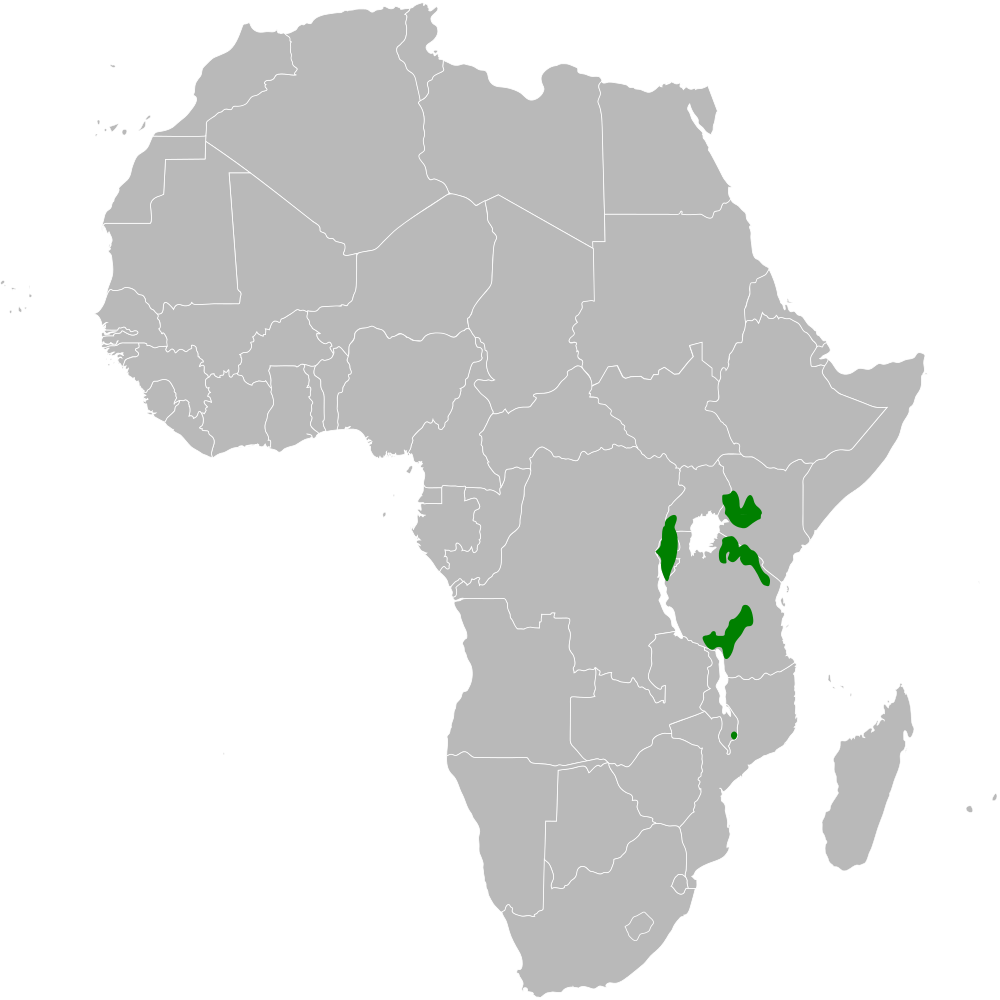

Synonyms
- Andropadus nigriceps; Pycnonotus nigriceps; Pycnonotus tephrolaemus nigriceps; Xenocichla nigriceps

= Black-headed mountain greenbul =

Species of bird

The black-headed mountain greenbul (Arizelocichla nigriceps), also known as the mountain greenbul or eastern mountain greenbul, is a species of the bulbul family of passerine birds. It is native to the eastern Afromontane. Its diet consists of fruit and nectar.

== Taxonomy and systematics ==
The black-headed mountain greenbul was originally described in the genus Xenocichla (a synonym for Bleda), then classified in Andropadus and, in 2010 re-classified to the new genus Arizelocichla. Alternatively, some authorities classify the black-headed mountain greenbul in the genus Pycnonotus. Some authorities also consider the olive-breasted mountain greenbul to be a subspecies of the mountain greenbul, while others consider the mountain greenbul itself to be a subspecies of the western mountain greenbul. The common name, 'mountain greenbul', is also used as an alternate name for the western and Cameroon greenbuls.
