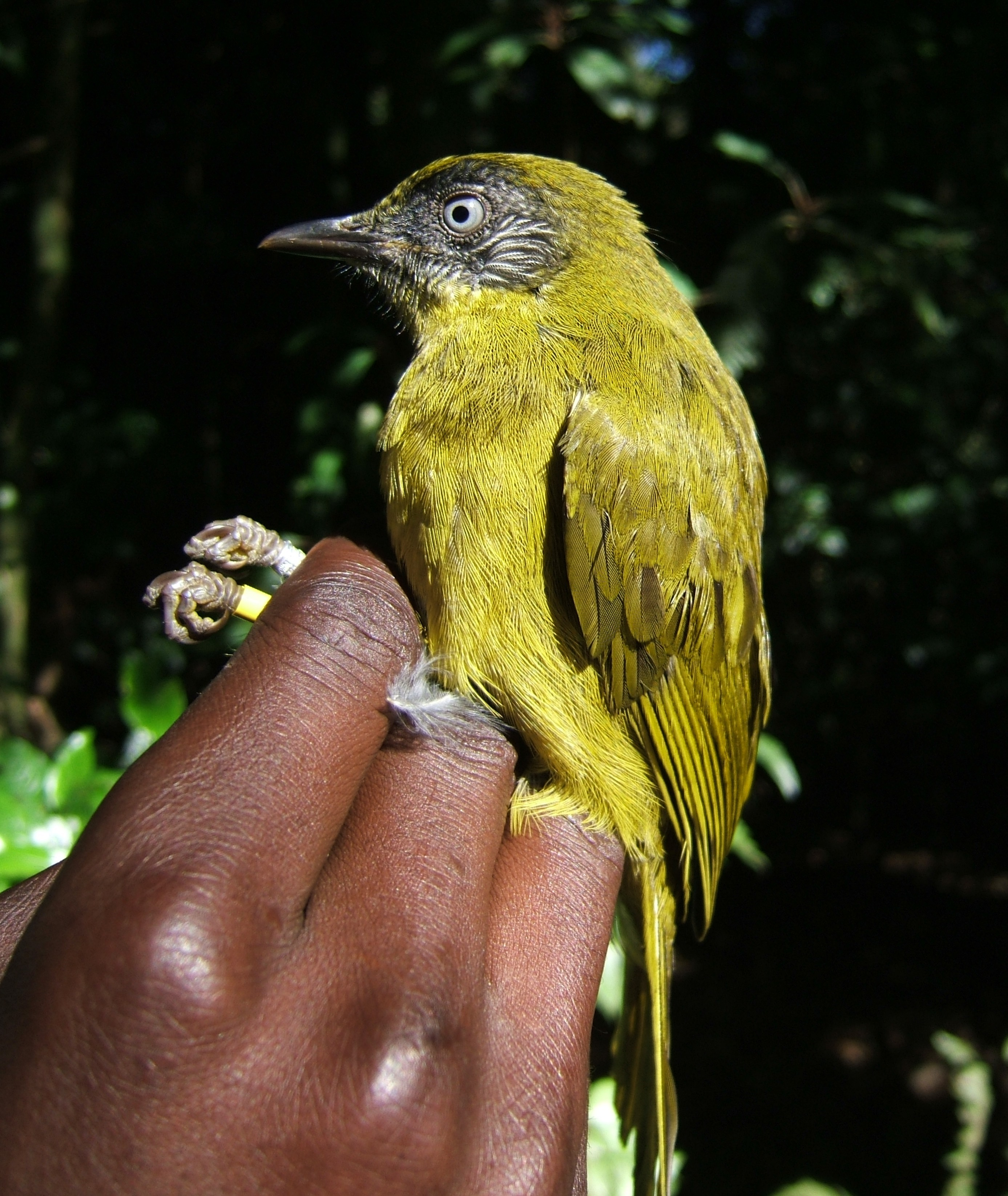

Conservation status
- Least Concern (IUCN 3.1)

Scientific classification
- Kingdom: Animalia
- Phylum: Chordata
- Class: Aves
- Order: Passeriformes
- Family: Pycnonotidae
- Genus: Arizelocichla
- Species: A. striifacies

Binomial name
- Arizelocichla striifacies (Reichenow & Neumann, 1895)

= Olive-headed greenbul =

Species of bird

The olive-headed greenbul (Arizelocichla striifacies) is a species of the bulbul family of passerine birds. It is native to the eastern Afromontane.

== Taxonomy ==
The olive-headed greenbul was formally described in 1895 by the German ornithologists Anton Reichenow and Oscar Neumann under the binomial name Xenocichla striifacies. The specific epithet combines the Latin stria meaning "furrow" of "striation" with facies meaning "countenance" or "appearance". This species is now one of 11 greenbuls placed in the genus Arizelocichla that was introduced in 1905 by the American ornithologist Harry C. Oberholser.

Two subspecies are recognised:

- A. s. striifacies (Reichenow & Neumann, 1895) – southeast Kenya to southwest Tanzania (Udzungwas)
- A. s. olivaceiceps (Shelley, 1896) – southwest Tanzania (Rungwe), Malawi and northwest Mozambique

The two subspecies were formerly sometimes treated as separate species with the English name "stripe-faced greenbul" used for the nominate subspecies and "olive-headed greenbul" for A. s. olivaceiceps.
