= Jimi Valley =

Jimi is a geographical area in the inlands of Papua New Guinea. It is located in the Jimi District of Jiwaka, which was previously a part of the Western Highlands Province until May 2012. It is home to the Jimi Valley. The Jimi District is one of the least developed districts in Papua New Guinea, apart from Green River in Sandaun and Rai Coast in Madang. Its geographical location makes it a remote district of the newly created Jiwaka province. The district is located in the Jimi Valley, which stretches from the northeast corner of Jiwaka and into Madang Province.

Jimi District is almost entirely mountainous and is mostly covered with rainforest, although this forest is disappearing quickly due to peanut cultivation. The District Headquarter is called Tabibuga, originally called "Tapia Poka".

The district is further sub-divided into three small sub-districts; Upper Jimi-Kol, Middle Jimi-Tabibuga and Lower Jimi-Koinambe. The district is named after Jim Taylor, who toured it in the early 1950s.

There are many different languages spoken in Jimi, with the major ones being Komblaka, Narak and Reai. Komblaka is spoken by people living in the Upper Jimi, bordering with the North Waghi District and towards the Kerowaghi District of the Simbu Province. Narak is spoken by the Middle Jimi people from Ngamba to Kwipun, with some living along the Bismarck Range and towards the western end of the Maikmol Villages. There are some people that speak the Melpa language of the Hagen and these people live along the range towards the western part of the district. Some people towards the Mt. Wilhelm speak the Simbu language, called the Kuman language.

== Population ==
The total population of Jimi District was 71,379 at the time of the 2011 census, although exact numbers are difficult to determine due to inhabitants' isolation and rural lifestyle. The population growth rate is estimated to be around 5.6%.

== Education ==
The first schools established in the Jimi Valley were all Christian schools, mostly run by the Lutheran Church, Catholic Church, Nazarene Church, and Anglican Church.

Jimi has a handful of primary and secondary schools. Jimi High School, serving the Kol subdistrict of Upper Jimi, was upgraded to secondary school status in 2019. The other two high school establishments are Kauil High School and Koinambe High School, serving the Middle Jimi and Lower Jimi districts respectively.

== Health ==
Many health centers and aid posts are built and operated by churches. Tabibuga Health Centre is managed and operated by the National Department of Health. Koinambe Health Centre is run and operated by the Anglican Church, while the Evangelical Brotherhood Church (EBC), Nazarene, and Catholic Churches establish and manage other aid posts in the district. Medical care for residents of the area can be quite limited at times due to insufficient road infrastructure.

== Religion ==
During first contact with the outside world in the 1960s, very few Christian missionaries ventured into Jimi Valley, where the inhabitants were still at war with each other. One notable missionary was Edward Wilhelm Bromley of the Church of the Nazarene, who settled in Tsingoropa in the Middle Jimi. The Catholic Church established itself in the Upper Jimi, while the Anglican Church occupied the lower part of Jimi and made headquarters in Koinambe. Other Christian denominations have also established influence in Jimi, including the Lutheran Church, the Seventh-day Adventist Church, and the Holiness Church. The Catholic Church has at present two Dioceses in Jimi, with one being at Karap and the other at Ambulua, Upper Jimi. The Church of the Nazarene in Jimi is now recognized as Bromley District with its own organizational structure and center at Tsingoropa Middle Jimi. Anglican Dioceses with its head office in Koinambe.

== Political ==
Since the 1st House of Assembly in 1973, Jimi has seen a good number of MP's representing them through ballot box votes, conducted at a five years space, starting from 1977 on-wards. Those that represented Jimi in the National Parliament were;

1. Kaula Dupai (Middle Jimi) - 1st Jimi MP in the House of Assembly, but died after a short illness.

2. Sir Thomas Kavali (Middle Jimi) (1973–1982) - Held Public Works Minister and in 1978 Cabinet, he held the Minerals and Energy Minister, and was one of the founding members of the National Party.

3. James Kuru Kupul (Upper Jimi) (1982–1992) - Did not hold any ministerial portfolio

4. Kimb Tai (Upper Jimi) (1992–1997) - Did not hold any ministerial portfolio

5. Bevan Tembi (Lower Jimi) (1997–2002) - Did not hold any ministerial portfolio. Contested under endorsement of Kimb Tai pruposly to split votes in the lower Jimi, but surprisingly un-seated. Kimb Tai. He was the only first MP to bring a sitting prime minister to any part of Jimi.

6. Francis Kunai (Middle Jimi) (2002–2007) - Did not hold any ministerial portfolio

7. Wake Goi (Upper Jimi) (2007–2012) - Was holding Minister of State assisting the PM on Constitutional matters, but did not perform as expected, leading to almost running the 2012 elections into chaos but was rescued by the intervention of PM. Contested under the banner of PNG Party.

8. Mai Dop (Middle Jimi) (2012–2017) - Did not hold any ministerial portfolio. Contested under the banner of United Resources Party (URP). He was the 2nd MP to bring in a sitting PM to Jimi and first MP to bring in a sitting prime minister to Tabibuga Station. However, the PM was very heart broken to see the run down state of the district even though he heard stories from his Pangia CEO (formerly DA), who happens to be a Jimi man.

9. Wake Goi (2017–present) - Currently the Minister for Youth and Community Affairs. For the 2017 election, he contested under the People's National Congress Party (PNC)

Even though Jimi has sent many representatives into the National Parliament, these MP's failed miserably to deliver basic services. Despite knowing the fact that Jimi needs good road to bring basic needed services into the area, past and present MP's have failed miserably to bring that sole important service. The Jimi Highway, the main road that links Jimi to the outside has been given little considerations by the past and present MP's. To date, Jimi highway is in a very very bad state, with links cut off completely past Konza area after the monsoon seasons in March 2019. At present, (April 2020) transit points are held at the road cut off section where people travelling from Jimi to Banz exchange with those that travel from Banz to Jimi. It is usually a sad experience to face life like that especially with the complete cut off of Jimi's only life-line, the Kopun Highway when all things from transportation of basic necessity to school children's travelling and also other business activities are on halt during the road block. The last major maintenance was probably done around 1999 by the late Jimi MP Hon. Bevan Tembi.

Honorable mention should be given to the late James Kuru Kupul for services during his 2 terms in office. It was during his time in office that Jimi had its best ever service delivery. With his vision of connecting Jimi to the neighboring Chimbu, Madang and Mt. Hagen through a network of roads that would provide a platform for the flow of goods and services. During his reign the roads were made and extended for the length and breadth of the electorate they were in pristine condition such much that non 4 wheel drive cars could travel with ease. After failing to get re-elected a third time all his vision stopped and the roads and bridges have deteriorated ever since with subsequent MPs failing in their duties.

The Political Head of Jimi at present is Hon. Wake Goi, who is also the Youth and Community Affairs Minister. The Public Service Head is Lawrence Italy. However, the presence of the two (Political and Public Service Heads) has been missing in the district headquarters of Tabibuga since 2007. In the 2017 National Elections, Wake Goi was re-elected into the Parliament. Public services head is still Mr. Lawrence Italy, but as always, the presence of both are missing in Jimi. The Tabibuga District HQ is almost non-existent with all the district staff members operating on the streets in Banz and Mt. Hagen.

Since after Kaula, who was from the Morkai Tribe, no Morkai has contested and won the Jimi Open Seat in the general elections. In the 2012 elections it was predicted that Mai Dop, a local businessman would win the election, and he won, but failed to deliver and most importantly failed to bring Tabibuga Station back to its glory days although he was a local man around Tabibuga station. Mai has contested under the banner of URP (United Resources Party). William Duma is the party leader of the URP. Mai's first set of development has seen machinery bought through the DSIP (District Support Improvement Program) fund for the upgrade of the long neglected Jimi Highway. The machinery were on the road passing Banz and started clearing and widening the Jimi road starting at Jimi – Waghi border. It was hoped that Jimi's lifeline would get a well deserved maintenance and upgrade. However, this has never been extended to the rest of Jimi but just stopped after a few kilometers even though it was started just past the Jimi – Waghi border. The machines are now run down and in dire needs for maintenance. During Mai Dop's term, it was noted that all decisions concerning the District's affairs were all conducted outside Jimi with a considerable portions of money spend on hiring of meeting avenues. A good portion of Jimi's budget was spent on hire cars and accommodation for unproductive meetings and gathering.

Up to now, there is questions how Jimi's public funds were used during Mai Dop's term because there is simply nothing to show for during his term. It is hoped that the current MP Wake Goi will find and bring into light the whereabouts of Jimi's K75 Million kina over the last five years during Mai Dop's term as it is simply a very huge amount of money that can transpire Jimi, or at least will show some tangible services that can last for some time. But the fact is there is nothing to show on the ground.

Current MP, Wake Goi has not leant his lessons during his term from 2007 – 2012. A good amount of money is seen spent on hire cars and hotels as usual with a few ad-hoc projects and services being delivered but that seem that will not have lasting effect if I am not correct.

With past and present Jimi MP failing to deliver to Jimi with basic but tangible services, the desire in the general Jimi peoples' mind nowadays is that they want someone with vast experiences in both public and private sector, with vast knowledge to handle million kina projects from project design to execution including logistics to take up Jimi's public office for a change. Most people are now looking at intelligent but dedicated professional from around Jimi to take Jimi forward. A few notable Jimi working in both private and government firms both in country and overseas but the question is are they willing to put their good job on the line to bring Jimi out of its doldrums. That hope can truly come into reality if the poor Jimi people are not lured by cash or bribery during the election period. If they want to see change, they have to change for the future instead of cash hands outs and cheap politics consequently leading to electing poor office holders. A few of us see the potential in this young man's heart to change Jimi and we hope that all Jimi take a bold stand for a change this time.

== Law and order ==
Law and order is a big problem in Jimi. At present 2018, there is no presence of police in Jimi and petty crimes such as stealing; street fighting etc. has risen dramatically. The Jimi District, through the office of the Jimi MP in 2013 has bought a new Toyota 10 Seater for the Police, but this ended up in the ditches after being on the road for less than a week as the OIC of Police in Tabibuga back then decided to go on a drinking spree. So one of Jimi's assets ended up in drain again. The current MP for Jimi (Wake Goi) is yet to put law and order priority in Jimi. Up to now (June 2020), there is no political support for Law and Order in terms of logistics, car, community policing and also village courts and community mediators. Peace and Good Order Committees are working on village and community level to keep peace at their designated area and they must be commended for a good job despite little to no support from the National office or the Political support.

Big court cases are handled out of Jimi, probably brought over to Minj District Court or sometimes brought to Banz police station. The village court systems still exists but the court cases are heard in the village and the magistrate hands down the decision that suits the nature of the case.

Marijuana and home brew consumption have been on the rise. It is widely known that most petty crimes are caused by those that consume marijuana. A surprisingly good number of young people are consuming marijuana, with majority of young boys between the ages of 12 and 25 years old. Cases of rape and killing related to sorcery is still head of but prosecution is not possible considering the geographical local of the places where these incidents happen.

== Economic activities ==
There are signs of economic activities going on around Jimi but not at large scale. Agriculture is the main player in terms of economic progress in Jimi Valley. Recently, rice has been distributed for planting and harvesting purposes. The Department of Primary Industry (DPI) through the Rural Development Officers (RDO) are carrying out active campaigns on food security in the area. National Agriculture Research Institute (NARI) has also stepped into the area by introducing cattle farming, duck and poultry, sheep, goat, fish etc. With the trial periods yielding better results than expected, Jimi is now considered ideal for the NARI introduced livestock. However, the trial projects for sheep and goat ended up in the hands of the locals and all vandalized with the sheep and goats slaughtered. Fish projects are seen to be doing well in the small village locations.

Apart from that, gold is panned widely around Jimi and there is little sign of commercial logging and coffee and peanut harvesting. Recently there has been a wild life center opened at Maikmol, which is named after the former Jimi MP, Sir Thomas Kavali. The wild life too is also struggling to bring in visitors due to the run down road condition in Jimi. Jimi has far more problems in road alone than any other infrastructures, and the state of the road does truly affect the service delivery and the economic progress in Jimi while the rest of the things are all clearly dependent on Jimi Highway alone.

Jimi's main cash crop is coffee. Recently, peanuts have been planted and harvested for sale in huge quantities. There are number of commercial activities going on in small scale like panning for gold, vanilla, rice planting and harvesting for local consumption as well. (more to be updated soon)

DPI in the area has also introduced aquaculture and to date, there are good number of people into this farming. These projects were carried out by NARI, however, all these projects has come to a halt.

== Infrastructure ==
In terms of Infrastructure services functional in Jimi Valley, it can be generally seen that all road, bridge and public infrastructure such as telephone, TV and postal services are non existent or in run down and in dire state, needing urgent repair. All bridges are at their age of collapse if not attended to soon, with some already collapsing last month (March 2020).

Since early 2010, there has been increase in the communication net work in Jimi. Mainly due to the fact that Digicel, through the initial rural roll out project initiated and co-headed by a former Digicel Switching Engineer, who is also from the Morkai Tribe of Middle Jimi and one of Digicel's first National Engineers) has established its towers which consequently elevated business activities and some improvement in people's living standard. Communication is very vital in the Jimi geographical land shape any yes Digicel step in to deliver. Some communication towers like, the one in Mongum (Ambullua) and Yawaremol have been damage by the local around the vicinity of the communication towers. Again, such public infrastructures are built and put in place so that the entire population can benefit, however, a greedy short sighted people cannot see what development is; and yet cry for service and development. I think they should change their mindset to see what development is.

== Climate ==
Jimi used to have a regular observed pattern of weather. However, this has gradually changed and it is now becoming more difficult to predict the weather at times. This can be directly linked to the climate change effect that the globe is facing and dealing at the moment. Back in the days, the locals usually predict the weather through the sunrise, and sunset and also looking at the shape and where the moon rises from, however, this cannot be the case anymore as the global effect on climate change felt by everyone else has also affected Jimi. The sun rise in Jimi is from 06:21 each clear morning and sunset at 18:17 on a clear afternoon.

The Climate of Jimi would normally be rainy season observed between the months of January to May and then dry season observed between the months of June to September and even up to October.

Normally, the bushes will be cut around the mid dry season periods, and then set on fires and prepared for planting. Towards the end of the dry season the crops would normally be planted, and the gardeners will await the approaching rainy season months. After the rain has watered the gardens, it is now weeding time, and the first lots of vegetables such as cucumbers and corn would normally be harvested, and then followed by the Jimi's stable food, the sweet potatoes (or normally called Kaukau).

== See also ==
- Jimi River
