= Koinambe Airport =

Airport in Koinambe, Jiwaka, Papua New Guinea

- IATA: KMB; ICAO: none

Summary
- Location: Koinambe, Jimi District, Jiwaka Province, Papua New Guinea
- Coordinates: 5°30′0″S 144°37′58.8″E

Koinambe Airport is a small airfield serving the village of Koinambe in the Jimi District of Jiwaka Province, Papua New Guinea.
