= Jimi River =

River in Papua New Guinea

Jimi River Jimmi River
- Location within Papua New Guinea

Location
- Country: Papua New Guinea
- Region: Jiwaka Province

Physical characteristics
- Source
  - location: Papua New Guinea
- Mouth
  - coordinates: 5°12′53″S 144°14′59″E

The Jimi River is a river in Jiwaka Province, Papua New Guinea.

== See also ==
- List of rivers of Papua New Guinea
- Jimi languages
- Jimi Valley
- Jimi District
- Jimi Rural LLG
