= Tabibuga =

- District HQ
- Location within Papua New Guinea
- Coordinates: 5.60°S 144.68°E
- Country: Papua New Guinea
- Province: Jiwaka Province
- District: Jimi District

Tabibuga is the district headquarters of Jimi District in Jiwaka Province of Papua New Guinea. It was established in the 1950s as a patrol post on a ridge in the upper Jimi Valley.

== History ==
=== Establishment ===
In 1956 or 1957, Patrol Officer Barry Griffin was sent to set up a new patrol post in the Jimi River area, then uncontrolled territory.

Radioing Mount Hagen, Griffin said the name of the area was something like "Tabibugara", which sounded too long to the operator. They settled on Tabibuga instead.

Using local materials, Griffin built the station on a ridge in the upper valley rather than on the flats of the lower Jimi.

The only access was a walking track from Banz in the Waghi Valley. It took a walk of two or three days over the divide to reach Tabibuga. Ian Skinner, the district commissioner, sent Blaikie to look for a donkey track for supplies, but none was practical.

=== Early years ===
Around August 1957, Skinner led a patrol to Tabibuga. Parts of the Jimi were still officially uncontrolled. Supplies were dropped from the air as the airstrip under construction was far from finished.

David Attenborough and Charles Lagus spent six days at Tabibuga filming birds of paradise and stone-axe making. Then they walked on with Griffin to Aiome in Madang Province.

=== 1960s ===
In 1963, pupils from eight language groups were attending the Jimi primary school at Tabibuga, and about half of them were boarders. When the patrol officer was away, the station was run by a police corporal.

The airstrip was in use by late 1967. It was 1,200 feet (370 m) long, on an 8° slope, and had cliffs at both ends and both sides. By 1998, the airstrip had closed and was overgrown.

== Jimi Road ==
Patrol officers at Tabibuga organized the building of a road over the range to Banz. The valley had roughly 25,000 people across multiple clan groups, and each clan group was given a section to dig.

At the peak of building the road, about 2,000 men were working unpaid. Together, they dug about 24 miles (39 km) of road in 24 months, and the road was officially opened in June 1970 by C. E. Barnes, Minister for External Territories.

Residents of the area have also traveled to the district headquarters at Tabibuga to press for a new road.
