= Waghi =

Waghi (also spelled Wahgi) may refer to:

== Geography ==
- North Waghi Rural LLG
- South Waghi Rural LLG
- North Waghi District
- Anglimp-South Waghi District
- Waghi River

== Languages ==
- Wahgi language
- Chimbu–Wahgi languages

== People ==
- Waghi Tumbe
