= Warakar =

Warakar or Wara Kar is a village in northern Jiwaka Province, Papua New Guinea, with a population of around 2,500. It is situated on the bank of the Warakar River. Most of the buildings are made from the traditional materials of kunai grass and wood with kunai roofs.

Around 50% of the population is literate. Most residents depend on agriculture, including some local officials. An electricity facility provides power to every house. A small market has been established to supply the daily needs of the people. All of the houses are supplied with clean drinking water from the Warakar River.

There is a secondary school next to the Majesty Waghi River.

Each ward area has a village councilor.
