= Mai Dop =

Papua New Guinean politician

Mai Dop (born 28 May 1968) is a Papua New Guinean politician. He was a United Resources Party member of the National Parliament of Papua New Guinea from 2012 to 2017, representing the electorate of Jimi Open.

Dop was educated at Jimi River Primary School, Kitip High School and Port Moresby Technical College, and was a businessman prior to entering politics. He was elected to the National Parliament for the United Resources Party at the 2012 election, defeating Wake Goi. He stated that "leaders are chosen by God" and that it was "God's will for me to be member for Jimi" and declared that his number one priority was upgrading the district's roads. Goi unsuccessfully challenged Dop's election, with Dop winning in the National Court and then in the Supreme Court in January 2013. In parliament, Dop serves as chairman of the Health and Family Welfare Referral Committee and as a member of the Education Referral Committee and the Public Accounts Permanent Committee.

At the 2017 election, Dop lost his seat to Wake Goi, the former MP who he had defeated in 2012.

National Parliament of Papua New Guinea
| Preceded by Wake Goi | Member for Jimi Open; 2012–2017 | Succeeded by Wake Goi |
