= Marie Reay =

Australian anthropologist

Marie Olive Reay FASSA (1922 in Maitland, NSW – 2004 in Booragul, NSW) was an Australian anthropologist, known particularly for work in the New Guinea Highlands.

== Career ==
Reay did undergraduate studies at the University of Sydney, taking anthropology after hearing A. P. Elkin debate the philosopher John Anderson. Reay went on to study under Elkin, who directed her to do fieldwork among fringe-dwelling Aboriginal people in north-western NSW. She did six-month stints of fieldwork at Walgett, Bourke, Moree, Coonabarabran and other communities. In 1953 she was awarded a research scholarship in S.F. Nadel's department at the Australian National University and later that year travelled to Minj in the highlands of Papua New Guinea. She performed fieldwork from 1953 to 1955 amongst the south Wahgi people and was hosted and supported primarily by the Kugika community at Kondambi village, principally by Luluia Wamdi (Luluia was a government-appointed village official). This fieldwork became the basis of her monograph "The kuma"

She joined the Australian National University in 1959 and worked there until she retired in 1988.

Reay was elected a Fellow of the Academy of the Social Sciences in Australia in 1977.

== Death and legacy ==
Reay died at Booragul on Lake Macquarie on 16 September 2004 and was buried in Toronto cemetery. Her papers are held in the ANU Archives.

Ten years after her death ANU Press published her 1965 manuscript, Wives and Wanderers in a New Guinea Highlands Society, with an introduction by Marilyn Strathern.

In 2016, ANU established the Marie Reay prize and three years later named a new education building in her honour. The Menzies Library at ANU hosted an exhibition of her New Guinea research in 2022 to commemorate her birth 100 years earlier.

== Selected publications ==
- Reay, Marie (1959), "The Kuma": Freedom and conformity in the New Guinea highlands, Melbourne University Press on behalf of the Australian National University
- Reay, Marie, ed. (1964), Aborigines Now: New perspective in the study of Aboriginal communities, Angus & Robertson
- Reay, Marie Olive (2014), Merlan, Francesca (ed.), Wives and Wanderers in a New Guinea Highlands Society, ANU Press, ISBN 978-1-925022-15-5
