= Koinambe =

- Village
- Location within Papua New Guinea
- Coordinates: 5.4843°S 144.5987°E
- Country: Papua New Guinea
- Province: Jiwaka Province
- District: Jimi District

Population (1973)
  - Total: 333

Koinambe is a village in the Jimi District of Jiwaka Province in Papua New Guinea. Its population was 333 in 1973. The village is served by Koinambe Airport and Koinambe Hospital.

In 1969, the Anglican missionary organisations the Rotary Club of Worcester South and Voluntary Service Overseas performed aid activities in the village. One of the intentions was to aid children of the village with a goitre-associated condition which affected 1 in 4 of them.

In 2011, a secondary school for the village built by the Anglican mission was opened. The school is named St Felix Anglican High School.

The hospital serving the village was established by the Anglican missionaries.
