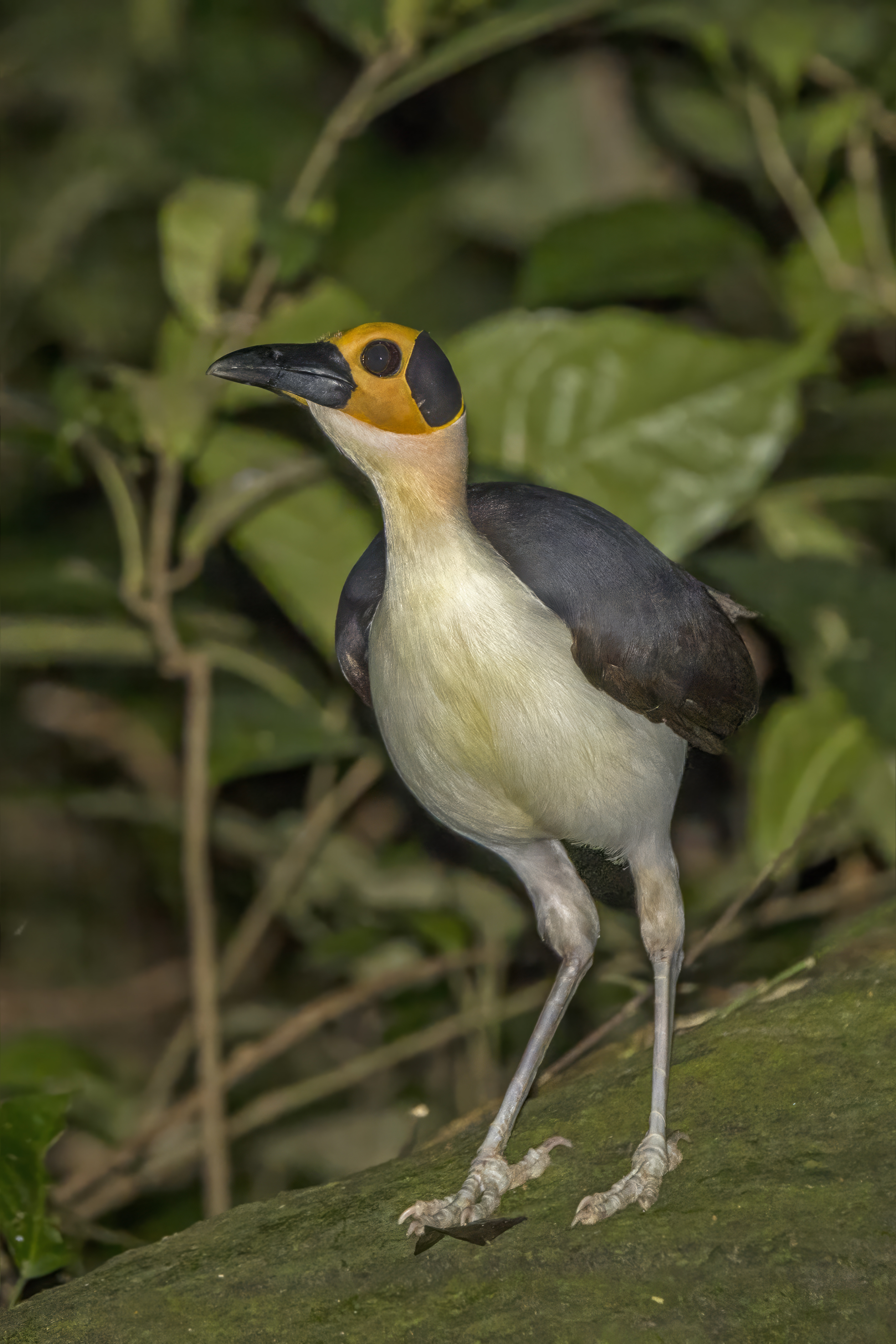
- Nyamebe Bepo Forest Reserve; Ashanti Region, Ghana

Conservation status
- Vulnerable (IUCN 3.1)
- CITES Appendix I

Scientific classification
- Kingdom: Animalia
- Phylum: Chordata
- Class: Aves
- Order: Passeriformes
- Family: Picathartidae
- Genus: Picathartes
- Species: P. gymnocephalus

Binomial name
- Picathartes gymnocephalus (Temminck, 1825)
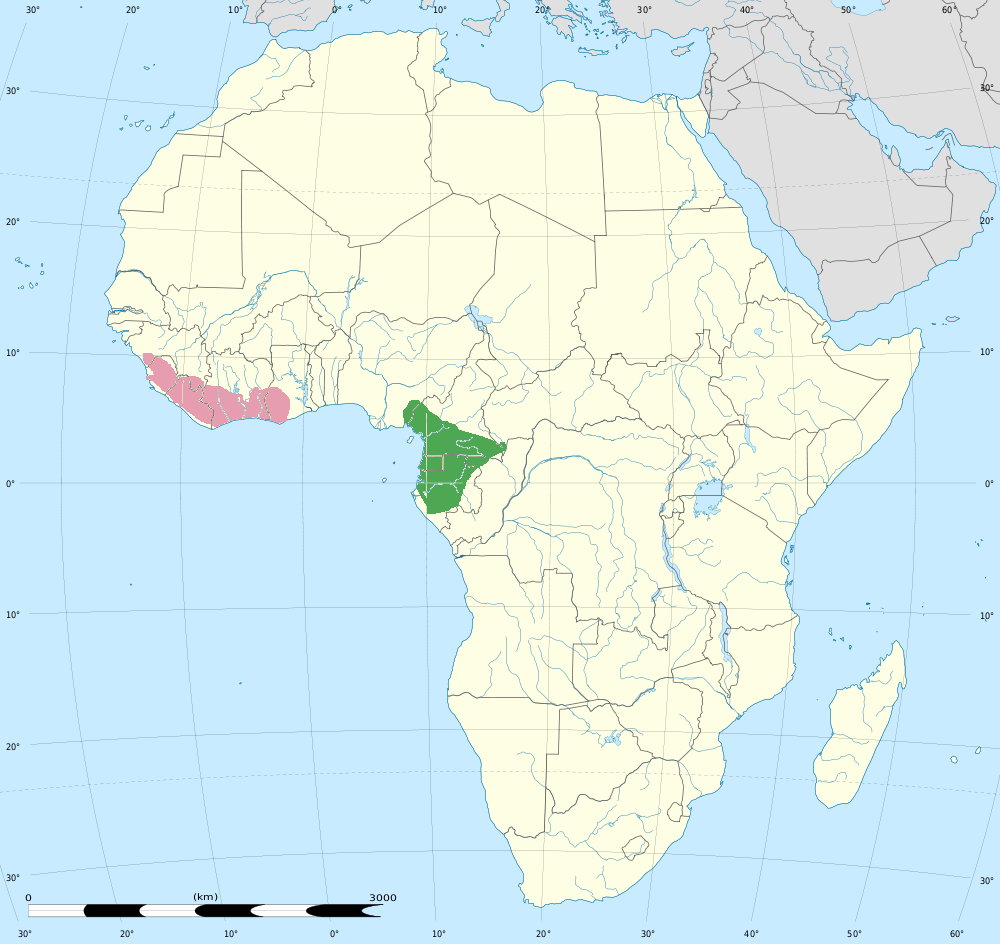
- The distribution of the white-necked rockfowl (pink), along with the grey-necked rockfowl (green)

Synonyms
- Corvus gymnocephalus Temminck, 1825

= White-necked rockfowl =

Species of bird found in West Africa

The white-necked rockfowl (Picathartes gymnocephalus) is a medium-sized bird in the family Picathartidae, with a long neck and tail. Also known as the white-necked picathartes, this passerine is mainly found in rocky forested areas at higher altitudes in West Africa from Guinea to Ghana. Its distribution is patchy, with populations often being isolated from each other. The rockfowl typically chooses to live near streams and inselbergs. It has no recognized subspecies, though some believe that it forms a superspecies with the grey-necked rockfowl. The white-necked rockfowl has greyish-black upperparts and white underparts. Its unusually long, dark brown tail is used for balance, and its thighs are muscular. The head is nearly featherless, with the exposed skin being bright yellow except for two large, circular black patches located just behind the eyes. Though the bird is usually silent, some calls are known.

These rockfowl feed primarily on insects, though parents feed small frogs to their young. One feeding strategy involves following Dorylus army ant swarms, feeding on insects flushed by the ants. Rockfowl move through the forest primarily through a series of hops and bounds or short flights in low vegetation. This species rarely flies for long distances. The white-necked rockfowl is monogamous and pairs nest either alone or in the vicinity of other pairs, sometimes in colonies with as many as eight nests. These nests are constructed out of mud formed into a deep cup and are built on rock surfaces, typically in caves. Two eggs are laid twice a year. Though the birds breed in colonies, infanticide is fairly common in this species, with rockfowl attempting to kill the young of other pairs. Nestlings mature in about a month. This bird is long-lived.

This species is classified as Vulnerable as its dwindling and fragmented populations are threatened by habitat destruction. Conservation efforts are underway in parts of its range in the form of habitat protection, education efforts, and new laws. Some of the indigenous peoples of Sierra Leone considered the species to be a protector of the home of their ancestral spirits. This rockfowl is considered one of Africa's most desirable birds by birders and is a symbol of ecotourism across its range.

== Taxonomy ==
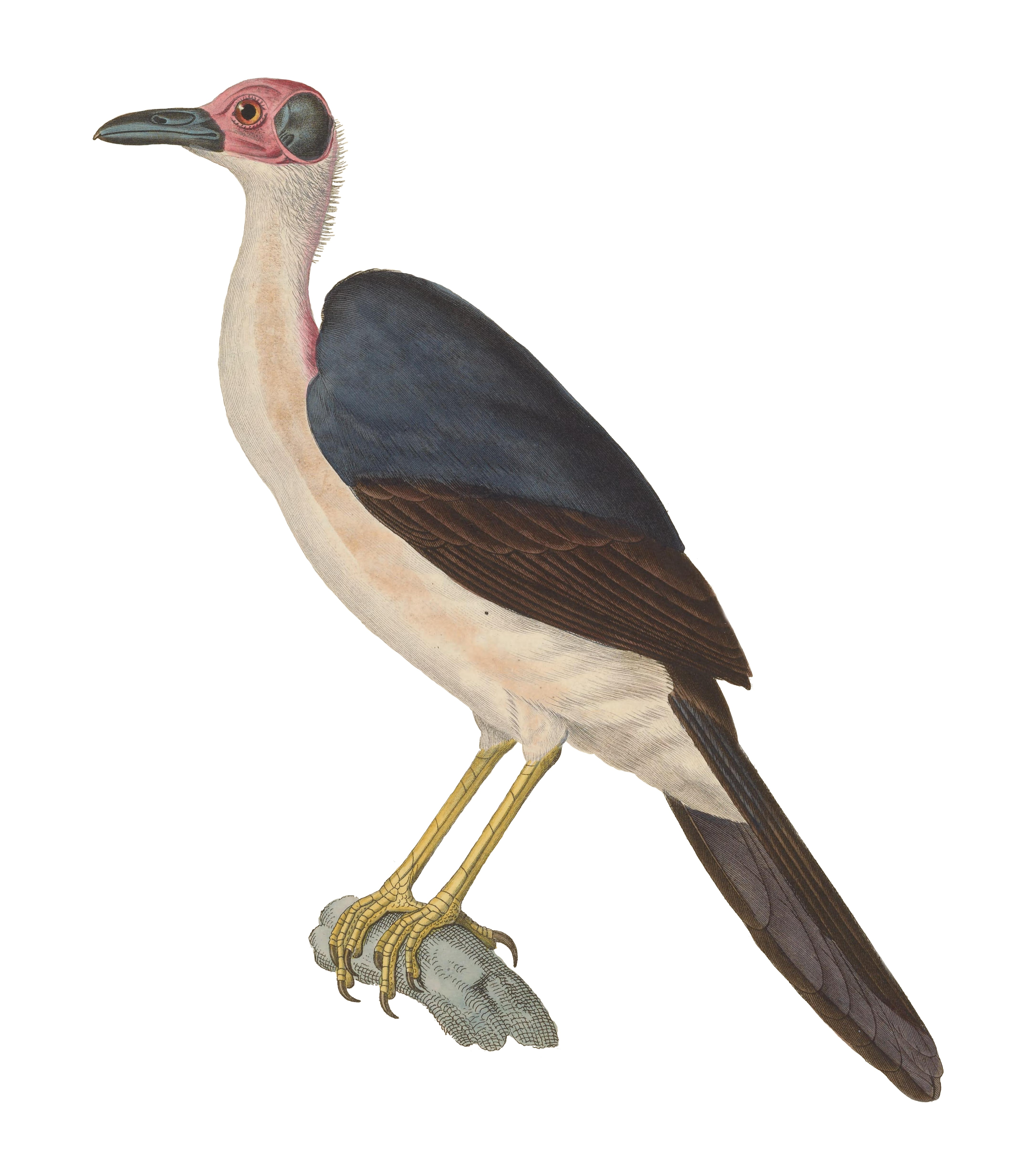
Illustration in Temminck's Nouveau recueil de planches coloriées d'oiseaux (1838)

This species was first described by Coenraad Jacob Temminck in 1825 from a specimen collected on the Guinean coast. He published his description in the 2nd volume of Nouveau recueil de planches coloriées d'oiseaux and described it as Corvus gymnocephalus, placing it in the crow genus Corvus. The species name is derived from the Ancient Greek words gymnos "naked", and kephalē "head". However, only three years later the bird was removed from the genus Corvus by René Primevère Lesson and placed in its own genus, Picathartes, as it did not share characteristics common to members of Corvus such as a feathered head. This generic name comes from a combination of the Latin genera pica for "magpie" and cathartes for "vulture".

Since its initial description, the picathartes have been placed in more than five different families, including those of crows (Corvidae), starlings (Sturnidae), Old World flycatchers (Muscicapidae), babblers (Timaliidae) and Old World warblers (Sylviidae). Today the white-necked rockfowl and its close relative the grey-necked rockfowl are believed to comprise a unique family, Picathartidae. It has also been suggested though not generally accepted that the two rockfowl represent the remnants of an ancient bird order. Recent DNA analysis has shown that Picathartidae and its closest relatives, southern Africa's rockjumpers and southeast Asia's rail-babbler, form a clade. The analysis suggests that the rockfowl split from the common ancestor of their clade 44 million years ago. It is believed that the ancestor of this clade originated in Australia and spread to Africa. Though the white-necked rockfowl has no subspecies, it is believed to form a superspecies with the grey-necked rockfowl, with plumage and facial pattern being the primary differences between the two species.

Common names used for this species include white-necked rockfowl, white-necked picathartes, yellow-headed picathartes, bare-headed rockfowl, and the less frequently used white-necked bald crow. Rockfowl is a reference to the species' habit of building mud nests on rock surfaces and caves. Picathartes refers to the species' scientific name. Bald crow is a reference to its featherless head and somewhat crow-like appearance, especially its beak.

== Description ==
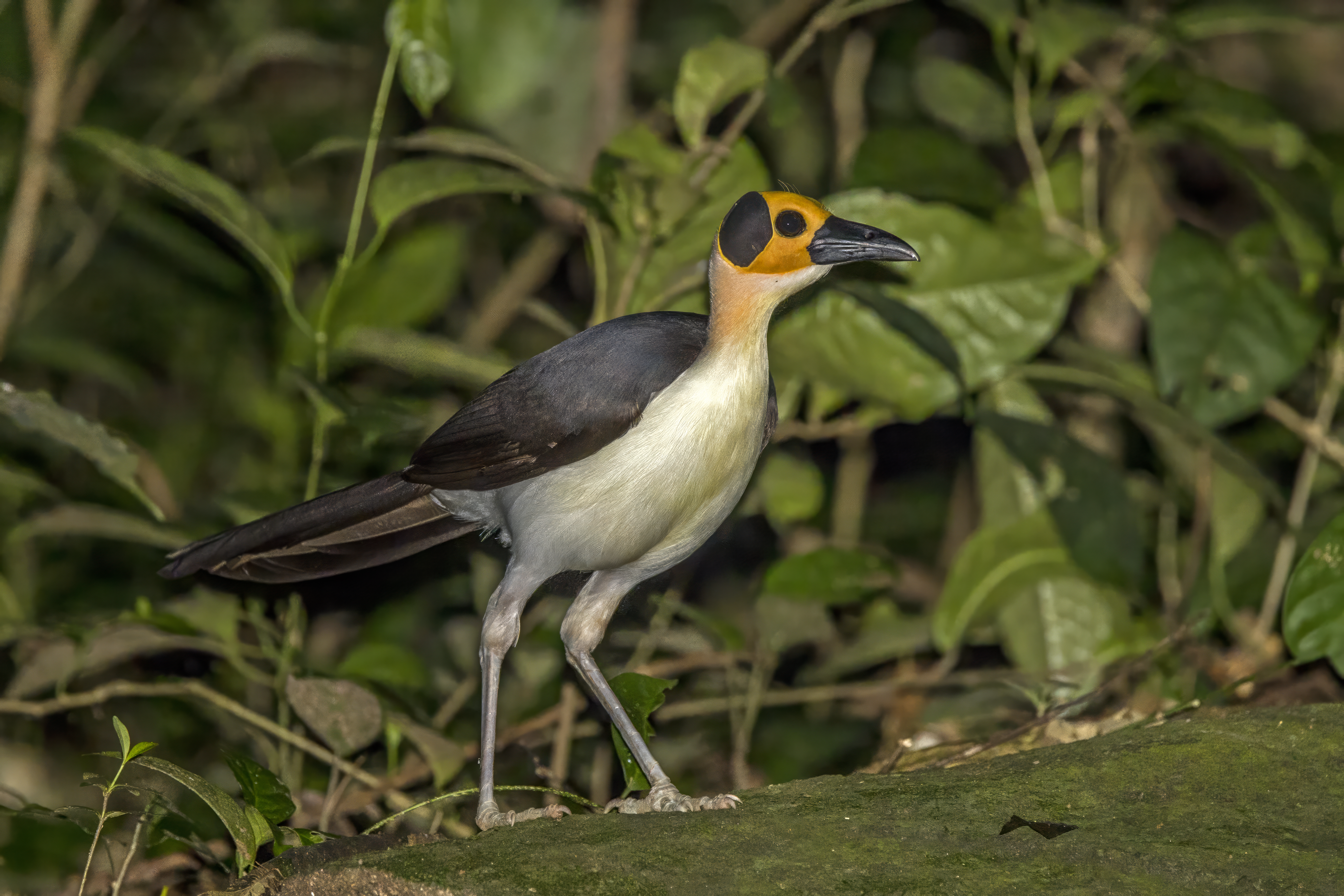

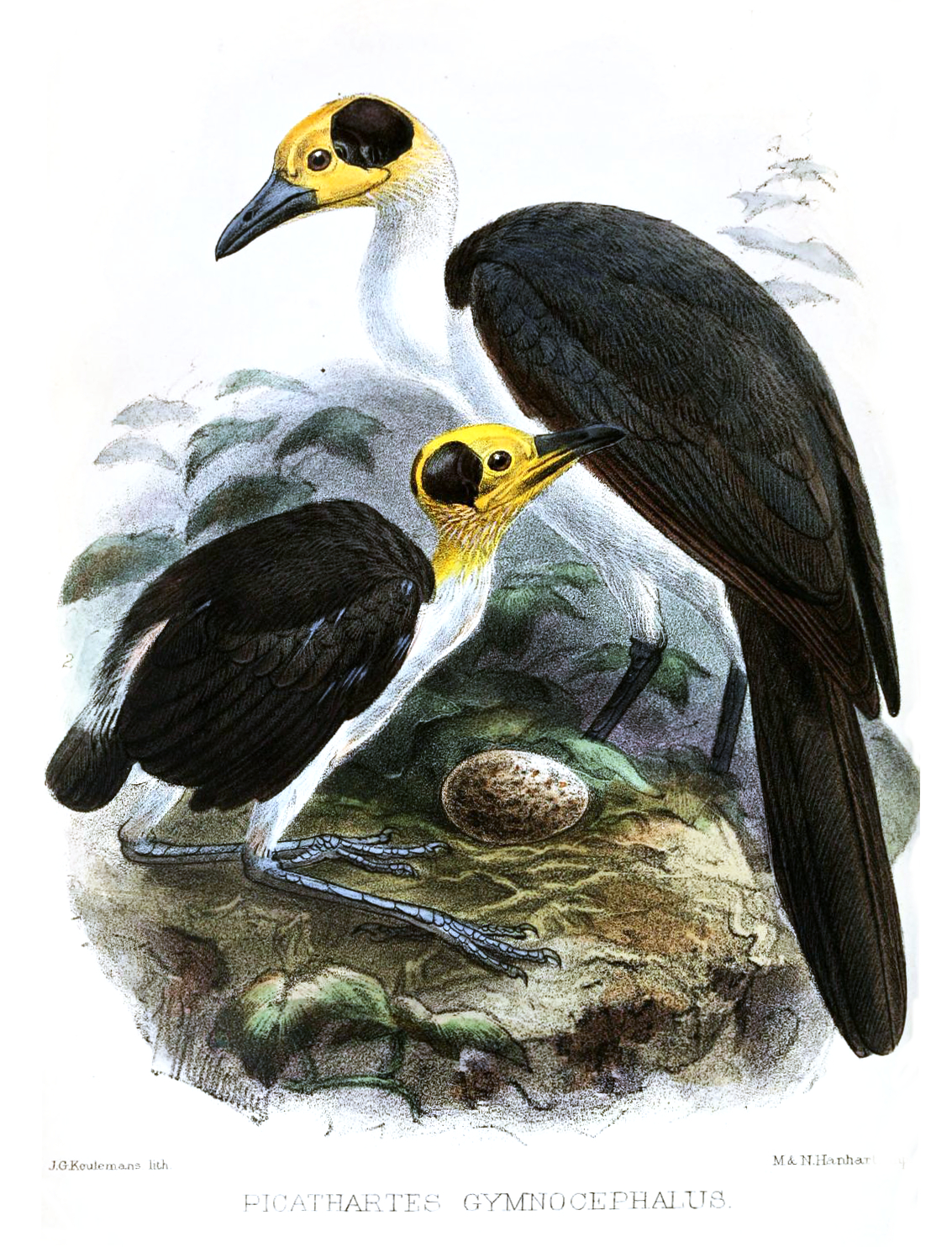
Juvenile (left) and adult (right) with an egg

This rockfowl measures around 38 to 41 cm (15 to 16 in) in length, with its notably long tail contributing about 18 cm (7.1 in). Adult rockfowl show little sexual dimorphism in plumage and the sexes cannot be told apart by appearance. On the adult, the head, excluding the chin and throat, is completely bare of feathers except for a thin layer of fuzz on the forehead. The head's skin is bright yellow except for two large, circular patches of black skin located just behind the eye and containing the ear; only a thin, 2 mm (0.079 in) wide patch of yellow skin on the crown prevents the two black patches from connecting. The black patch has a raised edge and appears to be a distinct part of the face. The eyelid and eyering are a thin line of black surrounding the bird's large, dark brown eyes. The beak is robust, disproportionately large, and black. This beak can be considered crow-like, is noticeably decurved in the upper mandible, and is about 30 mm (1.2 in) long. The bird's chin and throat are covered in a thin layer of white feathers, and the neck is long and slender. The nape is also covered in white feathers, while the hindneck is nearly bare, revealing the orange-yellow skin. The upper mantle is a solid black, merging into a greyish-black lower mantle. The rockfowl's thighs are very muscular and aid its partially terrestrial lifestyle. The back, rump, and undertail are a bluish grey, while the tail is a dark brown and tented in shape. The moderately-sized wings are also a dark brown. The underparts are a creamy white and appear their creamiest in the upper breast. In dim light the white-necked rockfowl can appear to be solely black above and white below. The legs are blue and relatively long. Overall the plumage appears to be smooth with long feathers. The adult weighs 200 to 250 g (7.1 to 8.8 oz).

The nestling is born naked with dark-brown skin above and translucent pink skin below, blind, and with an orange-red gape. After a few days, the gape changes to a bright yellow-orange. After hatching, the head's skin is all yellow without the black patches of the adult; these are gained about a week before leaving the nest. An immature rockfowl after its fourth week is very similar to the adult, but its underparts are creamier and silkier than those of the adult, its neck possesses fewer feathers, and the yellow on the head is paler. Most noticeably, its tail is significantly shorter than that of the adult.

Although numerous calls have been recorded, the white-necked rockfowl is normally a silent bird. Its call has been compared to the clucks of a chicken, with clucks of "chuk-chuk-chuk" or "choop-choop-choop" being made at a constant rate of eight notes every five seconds. This call typically lasts for at least a minute. It has been suggested that this call may be a proper song, but more research is required to determine if this is accurate. The rockfowl's alarm call, one of its more frequent sounds, has been described as a continuous, low-pitched, guttural chatter similar to "ow, ow, ow". Adults and juveniles have also been known to produce a long-drawn "owooh" call note. Additionally, fledglings can give a loud, quavering second-long whistle as a contact call.

== Distribution and habitat ==
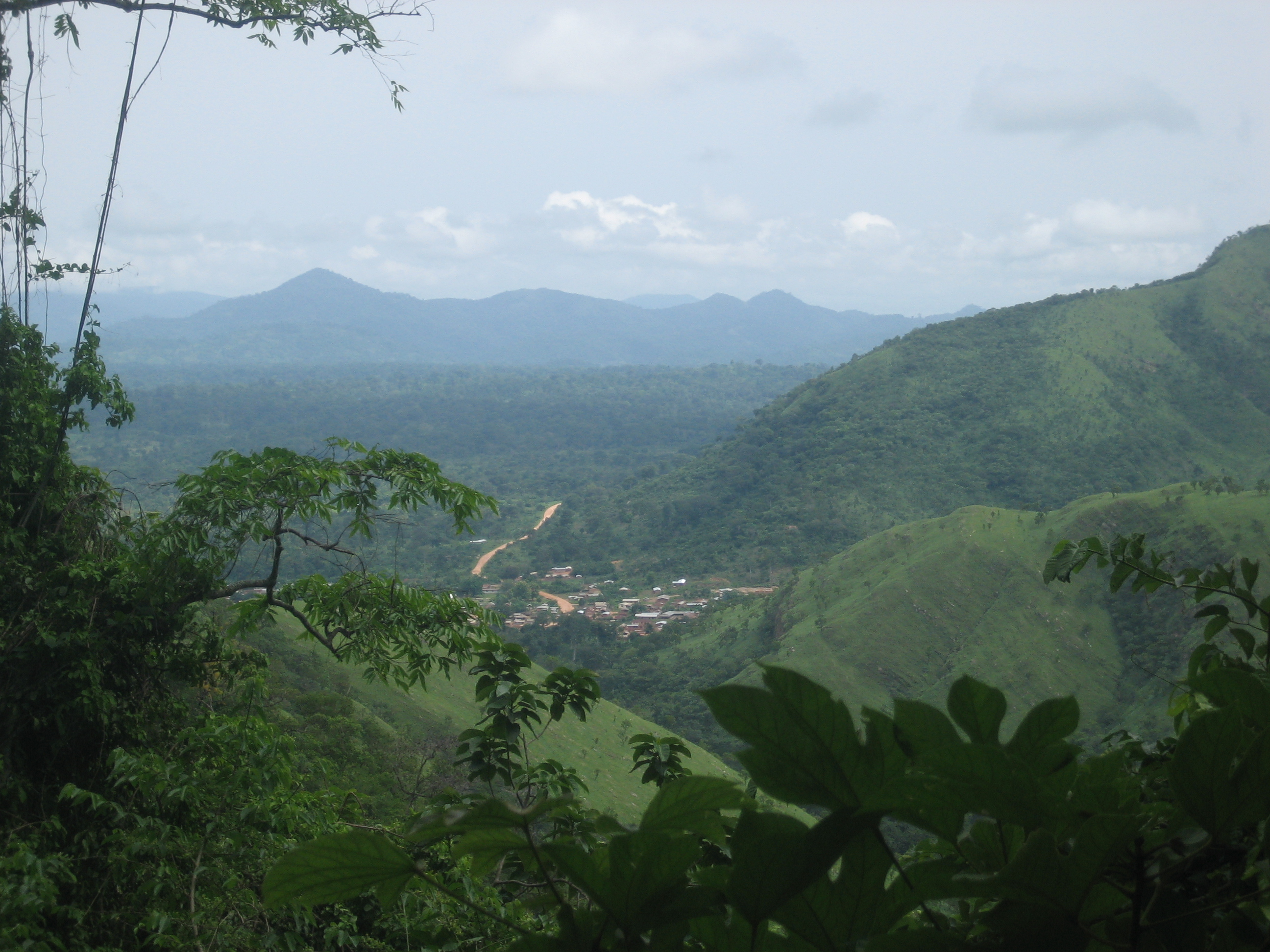
Ghana's Volta Region is a nesting area.

This species is found only in West Africa from Guinea to Ghana. It is locally common in southeastern Guinea, and is widespread in Sierra Leone except for the north and northwest, and in Liberia except for the north and northeast. In Côte d'Ivoire, the species is currently [when?] restricted to areas near the Guinean and Liberian border. The bird also lives in Ghana, where it is both local and uncommon in the south central parts of the nation. The white-necked rockfowl's total range covers approximately 391,000 km^{2} (151,000 sq mi). However, the species occurs in low population densities in patches across this large range. The species does not migrate, though it does disperse widely after the breeding season.

This rockfowl lives on steep slopes in both primary and mature secondary forests. These forests are typically covered in rocks and are found in hilly lowland areas up to 800 m (2,600 ft). The white-necked rockfowl often lives near flowing streams and rivers so that it has access to wet mud for nest construction. Colonies are typically found within 100 m (330 ft) of a stream. The species also seems to show a preference for living near inselbergs. Rockfowl are occasionally seen in partly cleared forests and near cities, but this appears to be abnormal. Recent surveys have shown that abandoned rockfowl nests are more likely to be in or near secondary forest.

== Ecology and behavior ==
This picathartes typically keeps low in the vegetation or on the ground near its nesting grounds. It moves quickly through its forested habitat primarily through a series of hops and bounds, followed by a pause before resuming its movements. It uses its tail for balance while traversing the forest. The rockfowl also flies at a low altitude for short distances between vines and trees, and it rarely flies for long distances. This species can disappear from sight into a mass of creepers or rocks. It is capable of high jumps, sometimes jumping 6 m (20 ft) off the cave floor to its nest while only partly using its wings.

It was once thought that the rockfowl rarely ventures far from its breeding grounds; however, new data suggests that the species has a much broader range than previously thought. Rockfowl have been known to continue roosting on their nests for a period following the breeding season. These birds are normally solitary or in pairs, though sometimes they live in groups of three to five birds. Typically, they silently evade any unusual movements in their forest. However, if these birds know that they have been sighted, they can become quite inquisitive and occasionally approach observers. One of the rockfowl's displays entails several of the birds in a colony forming a loose circle. Individual rockfowl run at each other, forcing the approached bird to retreat slightly before chasing either the bird that charged it or another in the circle. At intervals during this display a rockfowl leans forward on a branch, tucking its head between its legs and half-spreading its wings, thus revealing its crown to the other rockfowl. It is believed that this behavior shows the intent of the rockfowl to roost in a group, though recent evidence suggests that the display could be involved in breeding. To scratch its head, the bird lifts its foot over its wing. This species is long-lived.

=== Diet ===
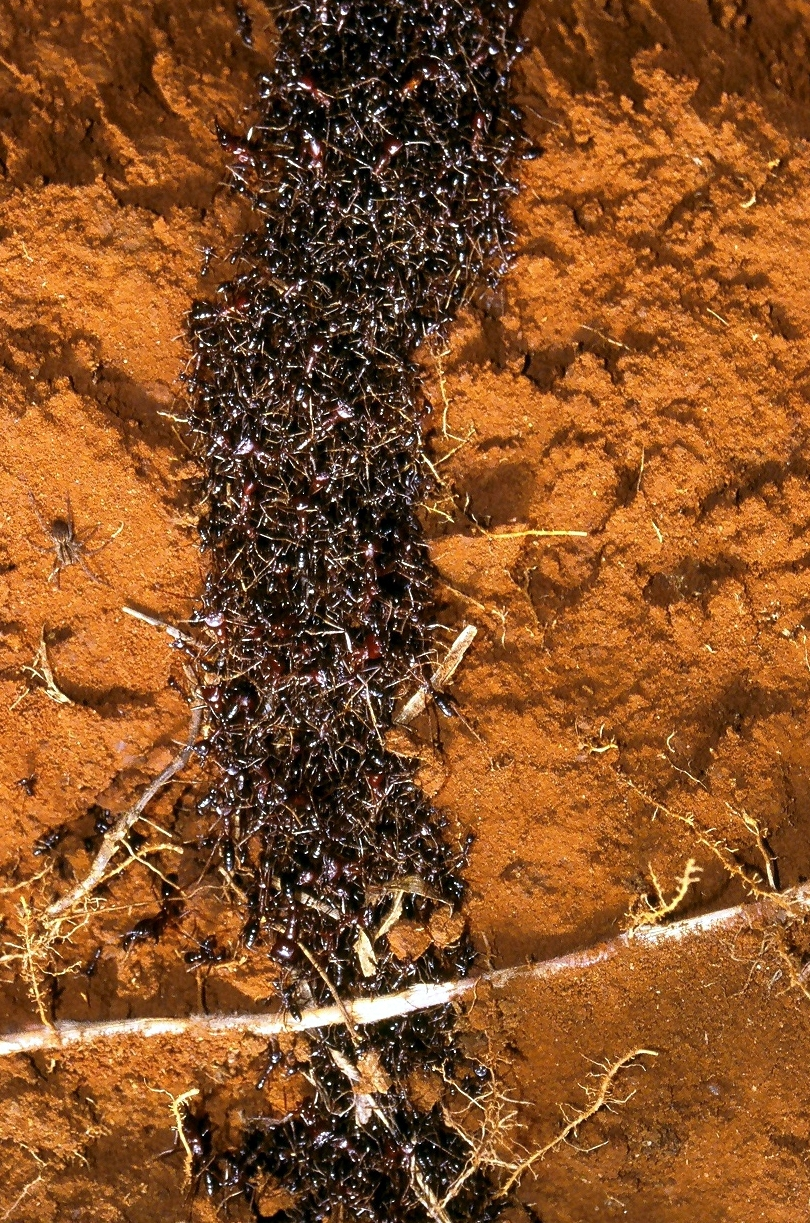
Columns of Dorylus ants, which flush prey items

The white-necked rockfowl forages across slopes on mossy, creeper-covered boulders and in trees covered in lianas and hanging mosses. It occasionally forages by hopping across sand by a stream or even in the stream, as evidenced by crab remains in the rockfowl's droppings. While foraging on the ground, the rockfowl picks up leaves with its bill and tosses them aside. It feeds in mixed-species groups ahead of swarms of Dorylus ants with alethes, bristlebills, and Finsch's rufous thrushes, picking off insects flushed by the ants, mostly off the ground. The rockfowl has also been observed hopping from the ground and snatching prey midair.

The diet is diverse and generalized, enabling the white-necked rockfowl to have a degree of adaptability in collecting food. This rockfowl primarily eats insects, including larval cockroaches, tettigoniid grasshoppers, earwigs, ants from the genera Pachycondyla and Dorylus, click beetles from the genus Psephus, and termites. Other than insects, it has been observed eating millipedes, centipedes, snails, earthworms, and occasionally small frogs and lizards. When feeding its nestlings, the rockfowl primarily collects earthworms, small frogs, and lizards, with the vertebrates forming most of the biomass fed to the young. In addition, rockfowl are occasionally seen eating plant material, normally from angiosperms or mosses.

=== Reproduction ===
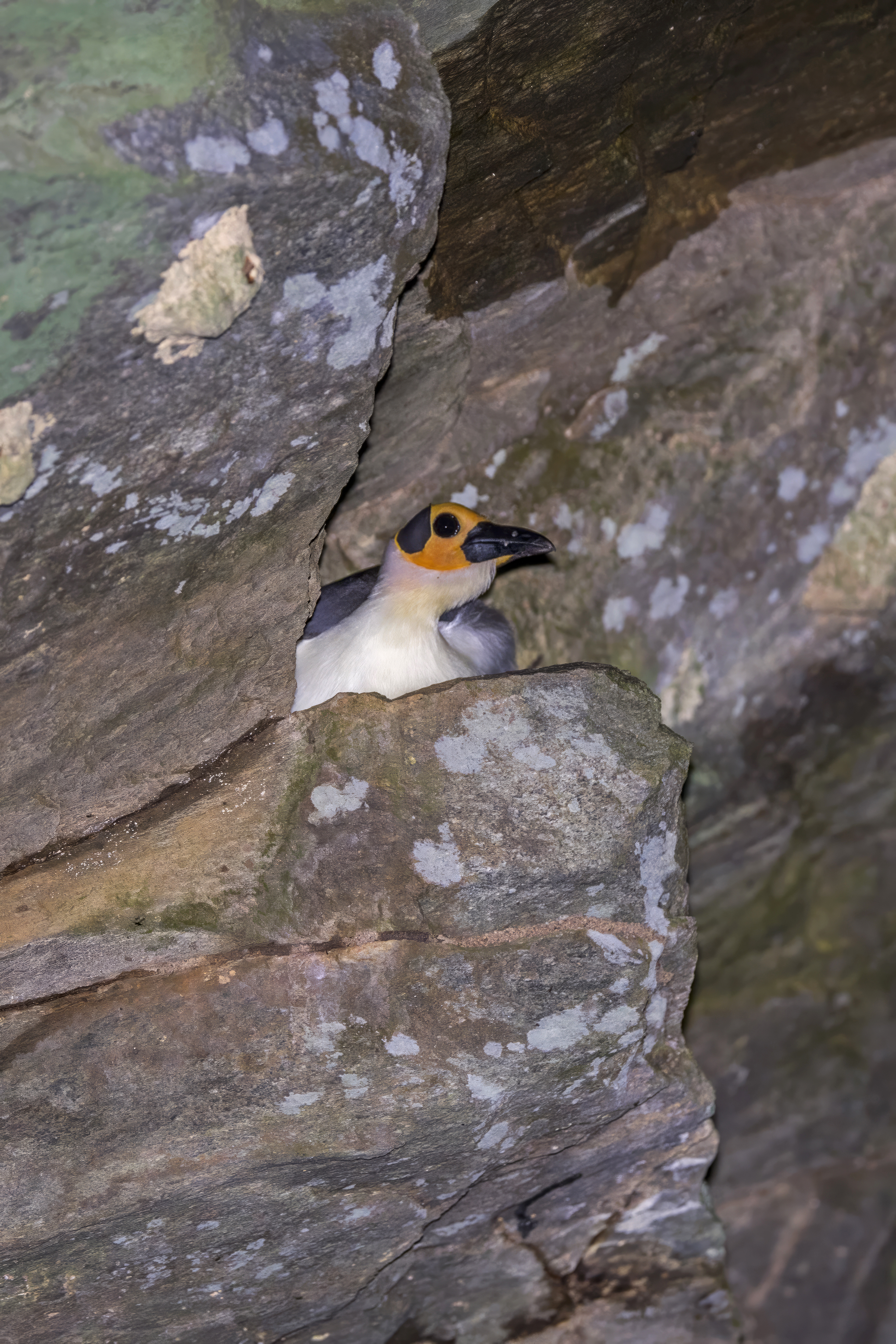
nesting under rock overhang

The White-necked rockfowl breeds primarily in caves and pairs nest either alone or as part of a small colony. While its courtship behavior is unknown, the species is monogamous and therefore does not breed with rockfowl other than its mate despite earlier suggestions that it bred cooperatively. The White-necked rockfowl has two breeding seasons throughout the year, though the timing of the breeding seasons is determined by the location of the birds and the timing of the wet season, with nesting occurring just before and after the wet season and averaging 127 days apart. The rockfowl reuses its nest, and typically repairs it two to eight weeks prior to laying eggs. Guinean birds breed from July to January, while those in Sierra Leone breed from November to February and from April to October. In Liberia, breeding occurs from September to December and from March to July. Ghana's rockfowl breed from March to June and September to November. Breeding caves are traditionally deserted while the rockfowl are not breeding, so increased usage by the rockfowl is considered a first sign of breeding. Nesting colonies average two to five nests, although one colony had forty nests. In addition to breeding birds, sometimes non-breeding rockfowl are present. These birds occasionally attempt infanticide to gain access to prime nesting sites or mates. Birds in these colonies often chase each other in circles, even through the treetops, a rare destination for this species.

Unusually for a rainforest-dwelling bird, the white-necked rockfowl builds a nest out of mud with varying amounts of plant fibers mixed in. Mud is collected from nearby rivers and streams and is shaped into a strong, thick-walled, and deep cup attached to the cave wall or roof, a cliff, or a large boulder approximately 2 to 4 m (6.6 to 13.1 ft) above the ground. These rocks must be sloped inwards to provide the nest with protection from the rain. Phloem fibers and roots from plants line the inside of the cup. The white-necked rockfowl's nesting caves normally are populated by wasps, and the wasp nests 2-to-3 cm (0.79-to-1.18 in) long are often found embedded in the rockfowl's nests. It is believed that in order to build their nest on the smooth cave walls, rockfowl use the nests of the wasps as a nucleus to build around. Cliff nests are always built at a distance from nearby plants. Both birds work on the construction of the nest, with roles alternating as one bird collects the materials while the other shapes them into the nest. The mud is sometimes swallowed and regurgitated prior to use. While nearly all rockfowl nests are found in caves or on cliffs, there are records of nesting occurring on a riverbank and on a fallen tree trunk. Nests are typically constructed at least 1 m (3.3 ft) apart, but one colony had six nests adjoining each other. Nests also vary widely in size, though they average to be 108 mm (4.3 in) long, 172 mm (6.8 in) wide, and 129 mm (5.1 in) deep. It used to be believed that each pair builds two nests, one for breeding and one for roosting; however, recent surveys have found no evidence of this, with all nests in the colony being used for breeding.

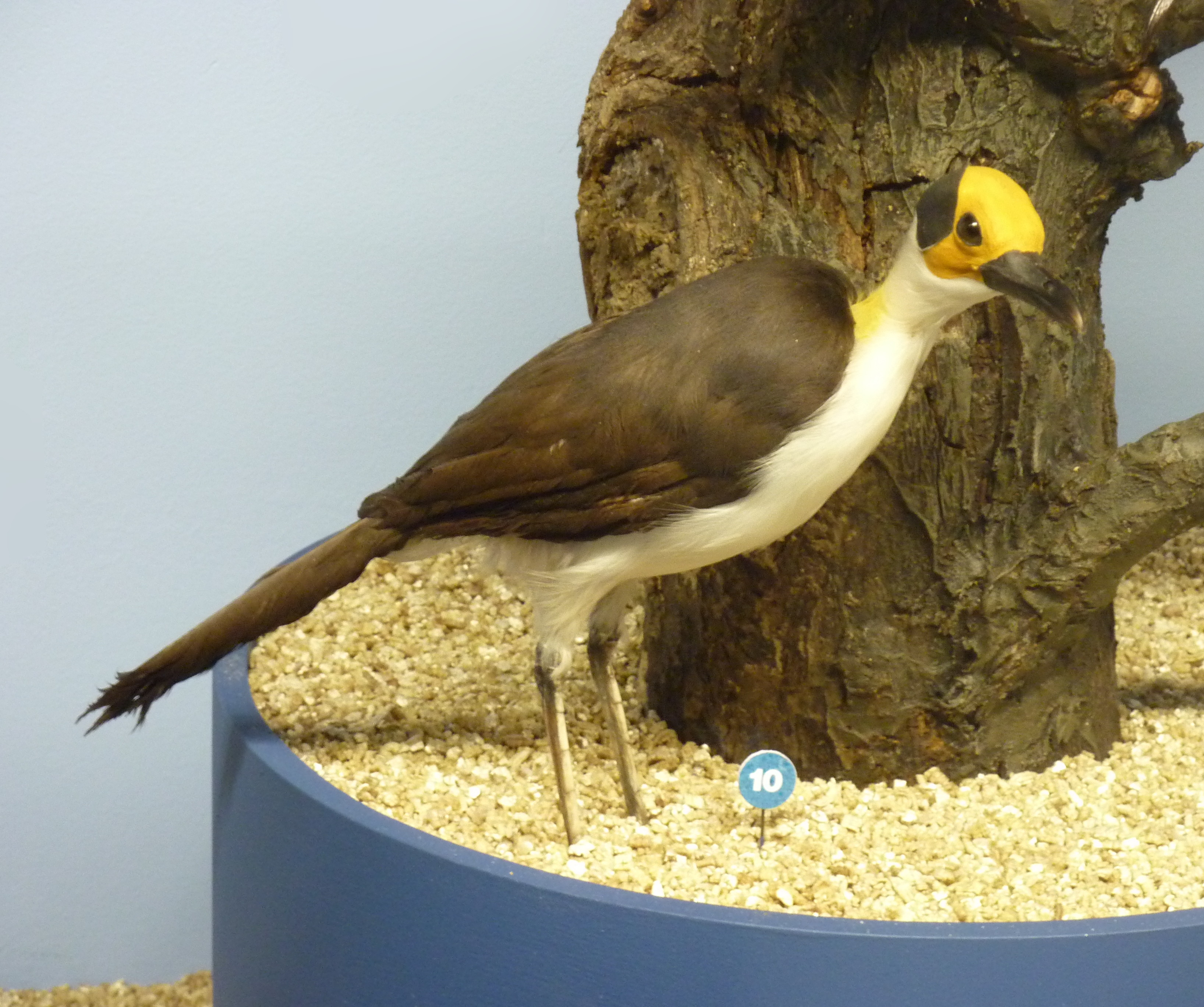
Museum specimen of an adult at the Natural History Museum of Geneva

One to two eggs, typically two, are laid in each nest a day or two apart. The eggs weigh about 14.5 g (0.51 oz) and have an average size of 25.8 by 38.3 mm (1.02 by 1.51 in). The eggs are a creamy white with dark brown blotches spread across the egg but in higher density near the larger end. Incubation, which begins after the first egg is laid, lasts for 23 to 28 days. The parents take turns incubating their eggs. Hatching typically takes at least 12 hours. The infant rockfowl's eyes open after nine to eleven days, while feathers begin to grow seven days after hatching. After the young hatch, food is brought to them almost four times an hour. To feed its young, the adult rockfowl clings to the side of its nest while fluttering its wings; some birds use their tails as a prop underneath the nest to help support themselves. Rockfowl have been known to kill the young of other rockfowl, while nest predation is carried out by cobras of the genus Naja, the Nile monitor, sun squirrels, red-chested goshawks, and Procolobus monkeys. This leads on average to only 0.44 nestlings surviving per pair of rockfowl. Due to potential infanticide by other rockfowl, parents protect their nest and vicious fights often occur. Rare among other bird species, this behaviour is prevalent in white-necked rockfowl. Not fully understood, it is thought to occur for the sake of resource competition or sexual selection. The young leave the nest after 23 to 27 days, at which time they resemble the adult rockfowl but with much shorter tails. The young leave the nest by standing on the edge, emitting a piercing whistle, and then gliding down to the ground on spread wings where they are met by an adult bearing insects. Even after leaving the nest, the young return to roost on it with their parents.

== Relationship with humans ==
In the lore of Sierra Leone's indigenous people, the often bizarre rock formations near which the white-necked rockfowl lives were believed to house ancestral spirits. Its residence there led it to be considered a guardian of the formations, leading to a degree of residual respect for the species that persists despite the beliefs that spawned this respect being practically extinct. However, in some regions the rockfowl's secretive habits and inaccessible habitat have meant it was unknown to the local population. Conversely, migrant Liberian hunters sometimes catch the nestlings for food. Due to this species' uniqueness it became a symbol for ecotourism and rainforest conservation in the region in the 1990s. The white-necked rockfowl has been depicted on numerous postage stamps from Ghana and Sierra Leone. Due to its strange appearance and behavior and the difficulty in seeing the species, this bird is considered particularly fascinating by birdwatchers. This species is considered to be one of the five most desirable birds in Africa by ornithologists.

This species also helped launch Sir David Attenborough's career in 1954, when he was the producer on the new television program Zoo Quest. The show's presenter Jack Lester was required to travel to Africa to record attempts to capture animals for display in zoos, with the focus of the series being on the white-necked rockfowl. However, when he fell ill, Attenborough took his place, which launched him into the limelight and starting his narrating career.

=== Conservation ===
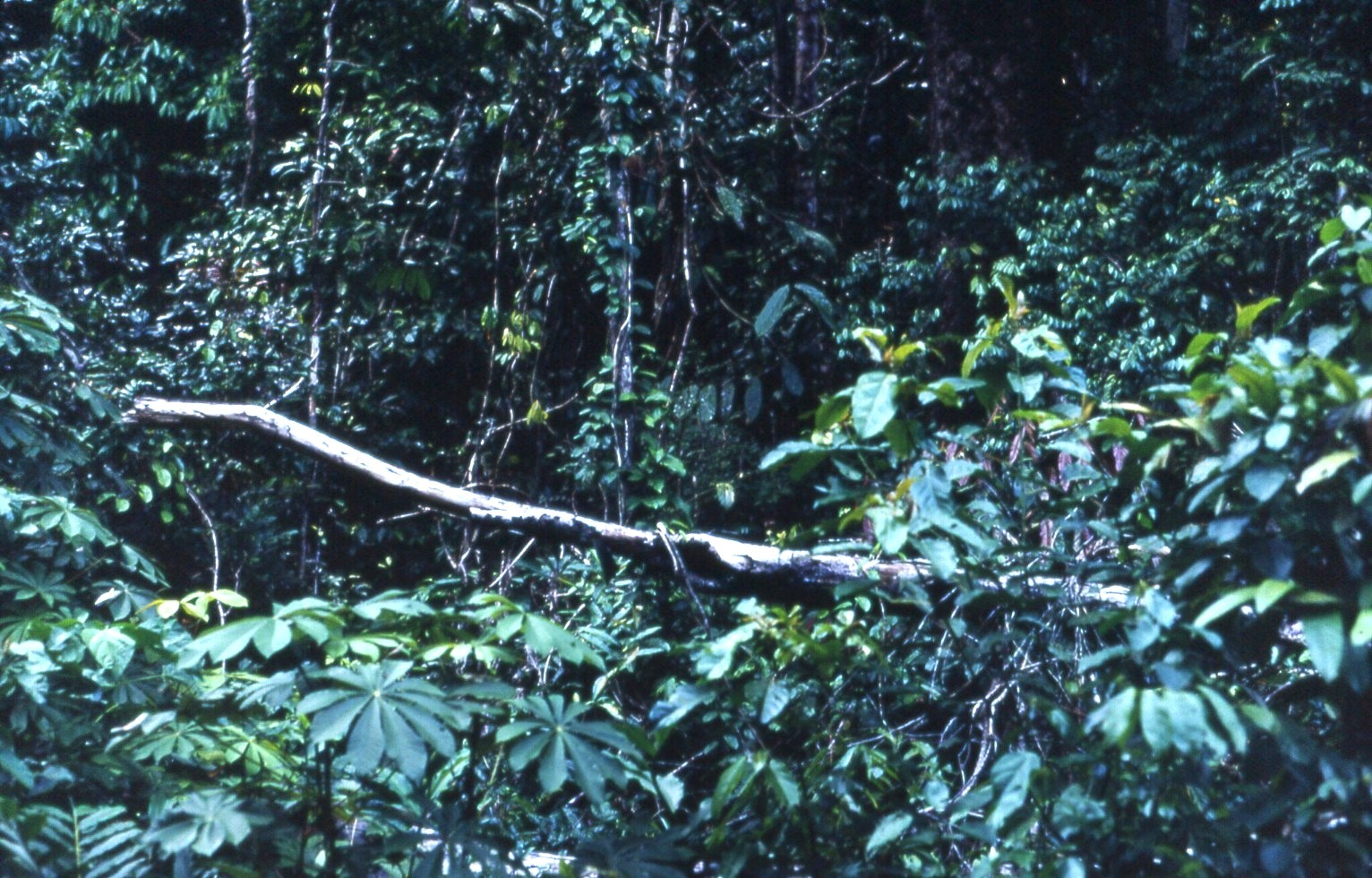
Liberian rainforest near a logging site

This species is considered Vulnerable by the IUCN due to its highly fragmented distribution, dwindling population, and habitat destruction. It is considered to be less common and more threatened than the closely related grey-necked rockfowl. The stronghold of the species is in Sierra Leone and southern Guinea, where the bird is still locally common if difficult to locate. It is estimated that only 2,500 to 10,000 white-necked rockfowl survive, with the population dwindling and spread out over a known 32 sites; however, most individuals studying this species believe that the population is far fewer than the 10,000 maximum. Many of its colonies are currently approaching the minimum population size necessary to guarantee long-term viability against inbreeding. The primary threat is the commercial destruction of its habitat for timber. Although the white-necked rockfowl is capable of withstanding some disturbance of the nearby habitat, as demonstrated by one colony surviving after it was completely surrounded by a cocoa plantation, habitat disturbance is far more likely to negatively impact on breeding success. Most of the remaining colonies in Guinea, Sierra Leone, and Côte d'Ivoire are on protected land, while Liberia and Ghana's colonies are mostly unprotected. In part to protect this species, Sierra Leone recently upgraded its protection of the Gola forest by turning it into its second national park, Gola National Park, and has announced that the country intends to work with Liberia to form a trans-national park protecting the Gola rainforest. In return for lost logging rights, Sierra Leone has compensated locals with road and school renovations, additional training for police officers, and construction of churches and a mosque. Liberia has also expressed a desire to expand its national park system, which would help protect the species. In Guinea, the bird's forests are being logged to provide land for rice farming to help support farmers immigrating from the country's drier north.

Laws exist in Sierra Leone, Liberia, and Ghana to protect this species, but enforcement is minimal. International trading of the white-necked rockfowl is regulated as the bird is currently listed under CITES Appendix I. Additionally, in 2004 BirdLife International drafted an international action plan to provide strategies for protecting this species. This plan focused on surveying the remaining habitat, raising awareness amongst the local populace, and limiting the continued destruction of its habitat. In 2006, BirdLife International received a US$19,900 grant from the Disney Wildlife Conservation Fund to help enact this plan. Surveys conducted with this funding have resulted in the discovery of additional populations in Sierra Leone. Additionally, wardens have been trained to protect Sierra Leone's Western Area Forest Reserve. This plan, coupled with the bird's appearance and unusual habits, have led it to become a flagship species for habitat conservation across Africa and particularly in its upper Guinean forests.

Until 2003, the species was thought to be extinct in Ghana. Most of the Ghanaian sites from which it is known are active forest reserves, where logging periodically occurs. Outside of the reserves, bush-burning and mining for gold and other metals threaten remaining habitat. Following its rediscovery in Ghana, the Ghana Wildlife Society has begun to survey remaining habitat and implement conservation strategies.

In the 1950s and 1960s, collecting this species for display in zoos was a major threat, and in Liberia in particular this practice destroyed several of the bird's colonies. The rockfowl were captured by the indigenous peoples through the use of traps, while hunters in Guinea, who were already catching rodents and hyraxes at the bird's nesting colonies, sometimes captured rockfowl at night. In Côte d'Ivoire specimens were sometimes caught by bat-catchers. Most birds collected from the wild die within 24 hours. Despite over 70 white-necked rockfowl being displayed in zoos during the 1970s, captive breeding was a rare occurrence and no stable captive populations have been formed. Despite this, zoos did have limited success and at least one zoo was able to hand-rear a white-necked rockfowl. As of 2002, no white-necked rockfowl have existed outside of Africa since 1998.
