= Zoo Quest =

British TV nature documentary series (1954–1963)

- Series title card from Zoo Quest for a Dragon
- Genre: Nature documentary
- Presented by: David Attenborough
- Country of origin: United Kingdom
- Original language: English
- No. of series: 7
- No. of episodes: 42

Production
- Cinematography: Charles Lagus
- Running time: 30 minutes
- Production companies: BBC Travel & Exploration Unit

Original release
- Network: BBC Television Service
- Release: 21 December 1954 – 31 May 1963

Zoo Quest is a series of multi-part nature documentaries broadcast on the BBC Television Service between 1954 and 1963. It was the first major programme to feature David Attenborough. Zoo Quest can also refer to the series of books written by David Attenborough about producing the documentary series.

In each series, Attenborough traveled with staff from the London Zoo to a tropical country to capture an animal for the zoo's collection—a common practice at the time. Although the programme was centered around the search for a specific animal, it also showcased footage of other wildlife in the area, as well as the local people and their customs. Attenborough introduced each episode from the studio and narrated the footage his team had filmed on location. At the end of each series, the captured animals were brought into the studio, where experts from the zoo discussed them.

With the exception of the original 1954 series (which survives only as edited compilations repeated the following year), all episodes of Zoo Quest are preserved in the BBC Archives. The series was the most popular wildlife programme of its time in Britain and established Attenborough's career as a nature documentary presenter.

== Production ==
The seed for Zoo Quest was sown when David Attenborough produced and presented a three-part nature programme, The Pattern of Animals, in the early 1950s. While researching animals for this programme, he befriended Jack Lester, the Curator of Reptiles at London Zoo. Lester invited Attenborough to join and film an expedition to Sierra Leone. In addition to capturing snakes for the zoo, Lester hoped to catch a white-necked rockfowl (Picathartes gymnocephalus), which had never been kept in a European zoo before.

Attenborough, whose previous programmes had been studio-based, was eager for the opportunity to film animals in the wild. He also believed that the quest for the bird would make a compelling central story for the series. Attenborough and Lester were joined by a young Czech photographer, Charles Lagus, who became Attenborough's cameraman and traveling companion throughout Zoo Quest's run.

The team overcame BBC management's objections to film the trip on 16mm film instead of the BBC's standard 35mm film. As a result, colour film stock was used for its superior picture quality in this format, even though the BBC did not begin colour broadcasting until 1967.

The original plan was for Lester to present the studio portion of the programme, while Attenborough produced it. However, Lester developed an unknown tropical disease shortly after returning from Africa and was only able to present one episode before being hospitalized. (After several recurrences of the illness, Lester died in 1956 at the age of 47.) Since the programme was already scheduled, Attenborough stepped in as the presenter.

The first series, titled simply Zoo Quest, gained viewers with each episode. Attenborough recalled being stopped in the street and asked, "Are you going to catch that bird or not?" Six sequels followed, each named according to its theme. For example, Zoo Quest for a Dragon featured the first-ever television footage of the Komodo dragon, while Quest for the Paradise Birds focused on the birds-of-paradise of New Guinea.

Attenborough wrote a companion book for each series except the first. These books were later reprinted in abridged form as a two-volume set in the 1980s. Lagus also authored two books inspired by the programme: Benjamin, the Zoo Quest Bear (1957) and Operation Noah (1960).

By the time Quest Under Capricorn was completed, Attenborough felt the series had run its course. Additionally, the practice of capturing wild animals for zoos was falling out of favour as zoos became more conscious of their environmental impact. (Today, London Zoo only captures wild animals if a species is so endangered that a captive breeding programme is its only hope.) Attenborough then spent the next eight years as a BBC administrator, eventually becoming Controller of Programming for both BBC One and BBC Two, before returning to full-time programme-making with Eastwards with Attenborough in 1973.

Several episodes of Zoo Quest and Quest Under Capricorn are available to view in the BBC iPlayer Archives section.

=== Series ===
- Zoo Quest (1954) 6 episodes (missing)
- Zoo Quest to Guiana (1955) 6 episodes
- Zoo Quest to West Africa (1955) 1 episode (hour long compilation of first series, available on BBC iPlayer)
- Zoo Quest for a Dragon (1956) 6 episodes (available on BBC iPlayer)
- Quest for the Paradise Birds (1957) 6 episodes
- Zoo Quest in Paraguay (1959) 6 episodes
- Zoo Quest to Madagascar (1961) 5 episodes (available on BBC iPlayer)
- Quest Under Capricorn (1963) 6 episodes (available on BBC iPlayer as "Adventure" with "Zambezi")

=== Zoo Quest in Colour ===
In 2016, the BBC announced that footage from the first three Zoo Quest expeditions had been unearthed by the BBC Natural History Unit and discovered to have been shot in colour. At the time of the programme's inception in the 1950s, the BBC's film unit preferred 35mm film for television programmes. However, 35 mm cameras were often large and unwieldy, and Attenborough wished to use the more lightweight, handheld 16 mm film cameras for filming Zoo Quest abroad. The BBC eventually relented but only on the condition that colour film stock was used, as it allegedly provided the best picture quality for the format. (The BBC did not begin routine colour broadcasting until 1967.) This film was then stored away and forgotten until 2015 when an archivist reviewing the reels of film realized they were in colour.

As a result, a special programme, Zoo Quest in Colour, was broadcast on BBC Four on 17 May 2016. Ninety minutes in duration, the programme features footage from the first three episodes, showcasing highlights from Zoo Quest trips to West Africa and South America. It also includes notable scenes from Zoo Quest for a Dragon, in which a Komodo dragon was filmed in the wild for the first time. A few shots remain in black and white due to being filmed in low-light conditions on more sensitive black-and-white stock, and the programme also incorporates some of the original black-and-white studio footage. All of the colour material was remastered directly from the original negatives, resulting in much higher quality than the grainy and somewhat worn black-and-white kinescope film prints previously used.

Attenborough said: "I was astonished when someone said we've got nearly all the film of the first three expeditions you did in colour. I said, 'it's impossible, we shot in black and white'." He then recalled the original reasoning behind using colour film stock.

== Music ==
The theme music was "Peter" from Peter and the Wolf, Op. 67 by Sergei Prokofiev. The opening and closing music for the Paraguay programmes was the traditional Paraguayan tune "Pájaro Campana" (The Bell Bird), performed by Trio Los Paraguayos "The Bell Bird".

== Books ==
=== By David Attenborough ===
- Zoo Quest to Guiana (1956)
- Zoo Quest for a Dragon (1957), reprinted the following year with an additional chapter of material from the Quest for the Paradise Birds series
- Zoo Quest in Paraguay (1959)
- Quest in Paradise (1960), an accompaniment to the anthropological TV series The People of Paradise and Quest for the Paradise Birds
- Zoo Quest to Madagascar (1961)
- Quest Under Capricorn (1963)
- The Zoo Quest Expeditions (abridged combined volume of the first three books, 1980)
- Journeys to the Past (abridged combined volume of the next three books, 1981)
- Adventures of a Young Naturalist: The Zoo Quest Expeditions (new edition of the 1980 compendium volume with a new introduction and new photographs, 2017)
- Journeys to the Other Side of the World: Further Adventures of a Young Naturalist (new edition of the 1981 compendium volume with a new introduction and new photographs, 2019)

Zoo Quest for a Dragon, Quest in Paradise, and Quest Under Capricorn were released as audiobooks between 2006 and 2008, read by Attenborough, and are available combined as The Early Years Collection.

Life on Air, published 2002, is an autobiographical book by Attenborough which dedicates much of the first half to the Zoo Quest expeditions. It is also available as an audiobook read by Attenborough. It accompanies the Life on Air documentary film.

=== By Charles Lagus ===
- Benjamin, the Zoo Quest Bear (1957)
- Operation Noah's Ark (1960)
