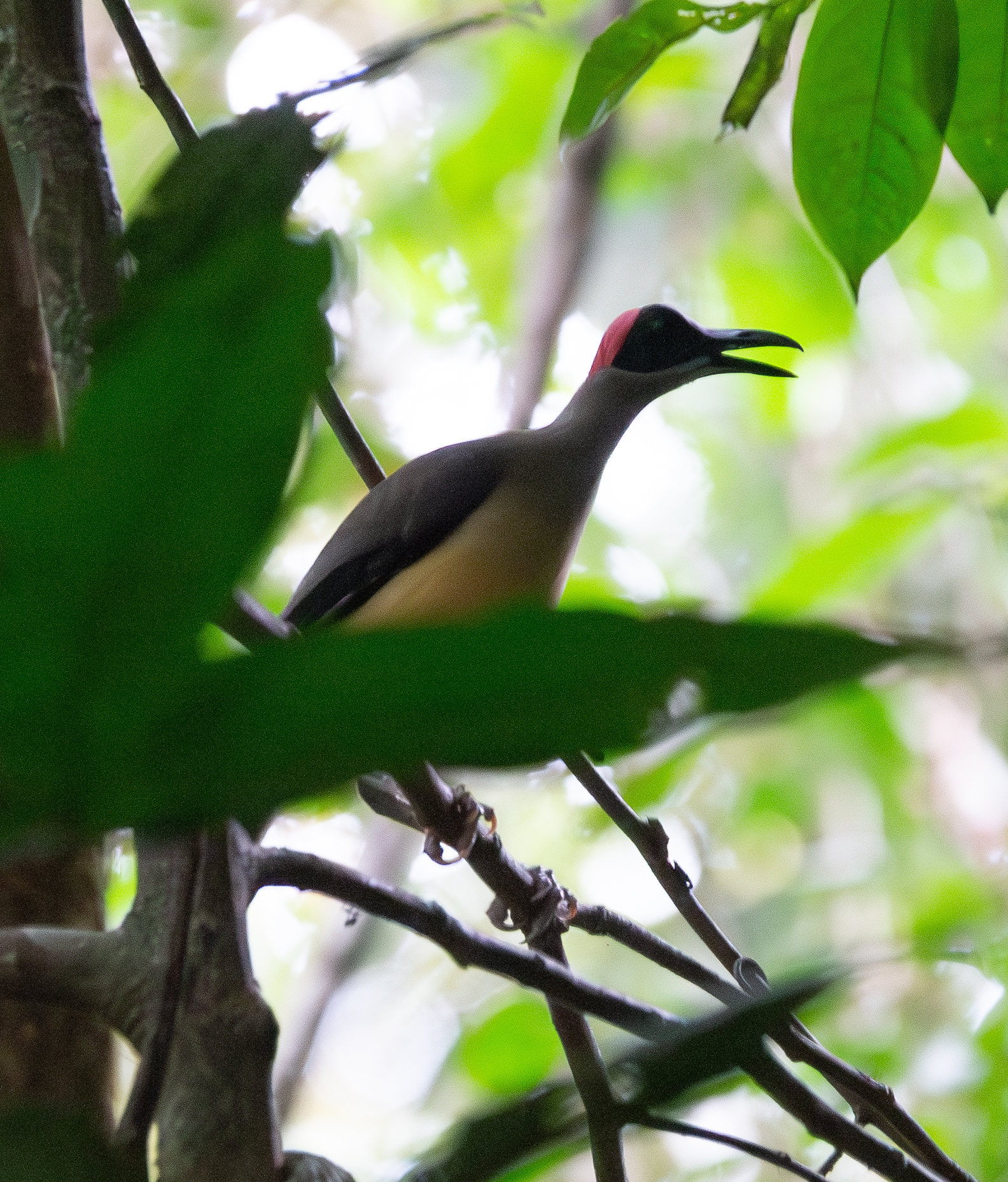

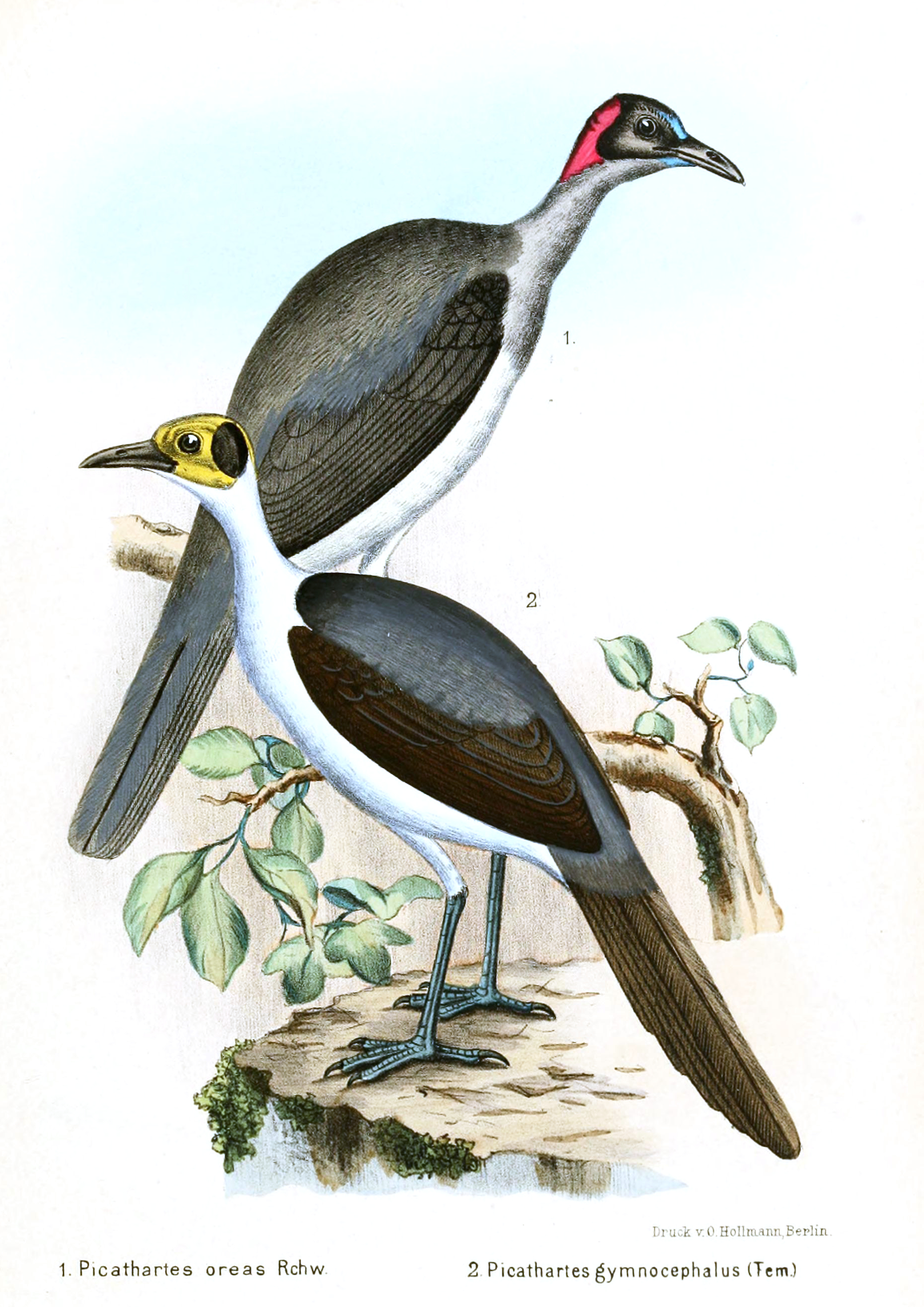
- Illustration grey-necked (background) with white-necked (foreground) rockfowl

Conservation status
- Near Threatened (IUCN 3.1)
- CITES Appendix I

Scientific classification
- Kingdom: Animalia
- Phylum: Chordata
- Class: Aves
- Order: Passeriformes
- Family: Picathartidae
- Genus: Picathartes
- Species: P. oreas

Binomial name
- Picathartes oreas Reichenow, 1899
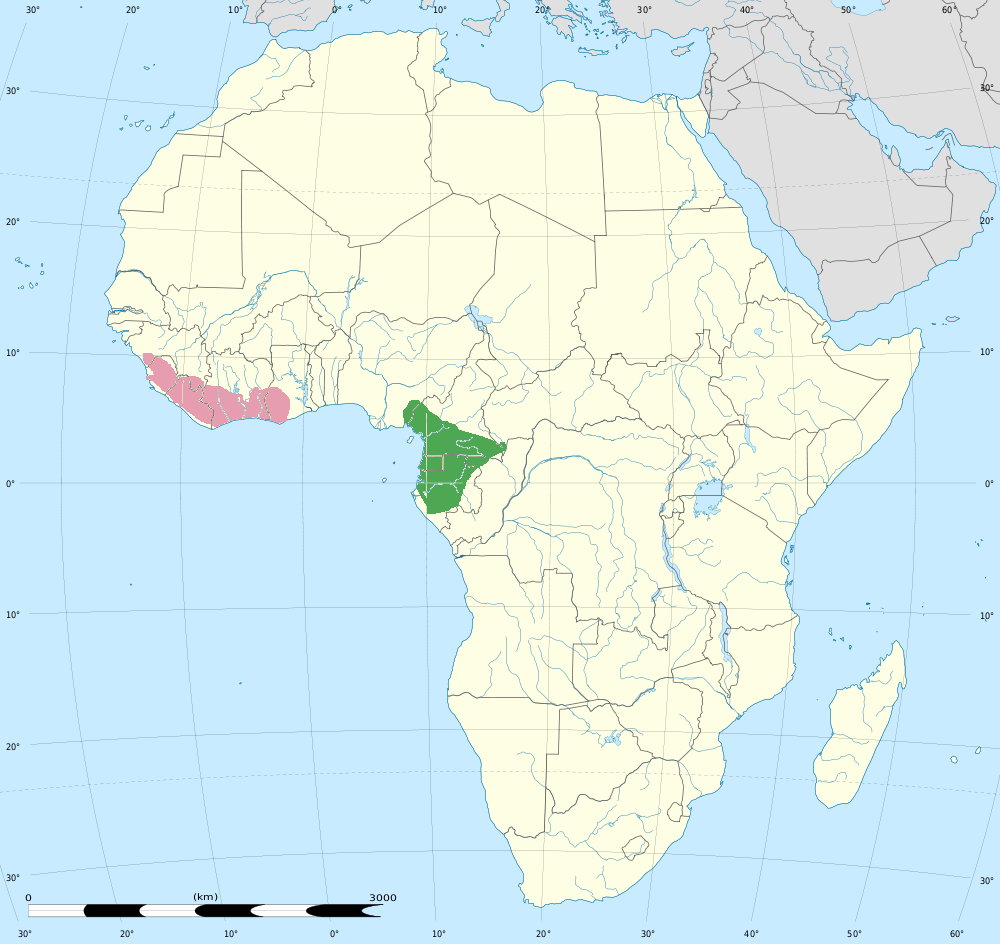
- The distribution of the grey-necked rockfowl (green)

= Grey-necked rockfowl =

Species of bird

The grey-necked rockfowl (Picathartes oreas) is a medium-sized bird in the family Picathartidae with a long neck and tail. Also known as the grey-necked picathartes, this passerine is mainly found in rocky areas of close-canopied rainforest from south-west Nigeria through Cameroon, Equatorial Guinea, and south-west Gabon. It additionally lives on the island of Bioko. Its distribution is patchy, with populations often isolated from each other. The rockfowl typically chooses to live near streams and inselbergs in its forested habitat. It has no recognized subspecies, though some believe that it forms a superspecies with the white-necked rockfowl. The grey-necked rockfowl has grey upperparts, a light grey breast, and lemon-coloured underparts. Its unusually long tail is used for balance, and its thighs are muscular. The head is nearly featherless, with the exposed skin being powder blue on the forehead and upper mandible and carmine on the hindcrown. The bird's cheeks and eyes are covered in a large, circular black patch that, though narrow, connects and divides the carmine and powder blue skin at the peak of the crown. Though the bird is usually silent, some calls are known.

This rockfowl feeds primarily on insects, though some plant matter, such as fruit and flower buds, is eaten. One feeding strategy involves following Dorylus army ant swarms, feeding on insects flushed by the ants. Rockfowl move through the forest mainly through a series of hops and bounds, or short flights in low vegetation. It travels either alone or in small groups. This species rarely flies for long distances. The grey-necked rockfowl is monogamous and pairs nest either alone or in the vicinity of other pairs, sometimes in colonies of two to five nests, though one colony of forty nests has been recorded. These nests are constructed out of mud and are formed into a deep cup that is built on rock surfaces, typically in caves or on cliffs. Two eggs are laid twice a year. Though the birds breed in colonies, infanticide exists in this species, with rockfowl attempting to kill the young of other pairs. Nestlings mature in about a month.

This species is classified as vulnerable as its dwindling and fragmented populations are threatened by habitat destruction. A conservation plan has been drawn up for this species, and research into its current distribution is ongoing. Some of the indigenous peoples of Cameroon either respect this species or, in some cases, fear it. Today, this rockfowl is considered one of Africa's most desirable birds by birders and is a symbol of ecotourism across its range.

== Taxonomy ==
This species was first described by Anton Reichenow in 1899 from a bird collected at the base of Mount Cameroon near Limbe, Cameroon. He published his description in Ornithologische Monatsberichte and described it as Picathartes oreas. The generic name was first used by René-Primevère Lesson in 1828 after he split the grey-necked rockfowl's close relative the white-necked rockfowl from the crow genus Corvus and placed it in its own genus, Picathartes, as the white-necked rockfowl did not share characteristics common to members of Corvus such as a feathered head. This generic name comes from a combination of the Latin genera pica for "magpie" and cathartes for "vulture". The species name is derived from the Ancient Greek word oreas, meaning "mountain". Since its initial description, the picathartes have been placed in more than five different families, including those of crows (Corvidae), starlings (Sturnidae), Old World flycatchers (Muscicapidae), babblers (Timaliidae) and Old World warblers (Sylviidae). Today the grey-necked rockfowl and the white-necked rockfowl are believed to comprise a unique family, Picathartidae. Additionally, it has been suggested, though not generally accepted, that the two rockfowl represent the remnants of an ancient bird order. Recent DNA analysis has shown that Picathartidae and its closest relatives, southern Africa's rockjumpers and south-east Asia's rail-babbler, form a clade. The analysis suggests that the rockfowl split from the common ancestor of their clade 44 million years ago. It is believed that the ancestor of this clade originated in Australia and spread to Africa. Though the grey-necked rockfowl has no subspecies, it may form a superspecies with the white-necked rockfowl, with plumage and facial pattern being the main differences between the two species.

This species has numerous common names, including the grey-necked rockfowl, grey-necked picathartes, bare-headed rockfowl, red-headed rockfowl, blue-headed picathartes, and grey-necked bald crow. Rockfowl is a reference to the species' habit of building mud nests on rock surfaces and caves. Picathartes refers to the species' scientific name. Bald crow is a reference to its featherless head and somewhat crow-like appearance, especially in its beak.

== Description ==
This rockfowl measures approximately 33 to 38 centimetres (13 to 15 in) in length, with its notably long tail contributing about 14 centimetres (5.5 in). This species does not show sexual dimorphism. The adult's head is largely featherless, and the skin on the forehead and forecrown as well as the upper mandible of the beak behind the bird's nostril is a powder blue. The lower mandible and rest of the upper mandible are black. This beak is unusually large and crow-like at 30 millimetres (1.2 in) in length and is also decurved. There are some small, bristle-like feathers located on the crown that can be erected. Behind the crown, the species' bare skin on the hindcrown and nape is carmine in coloration and has a few more bristle-like feathers. The area between these patches of skin, as well as the lores, cheeks, and ear region, are featherless with black skin. Its eyes are dark brown. The grey-necked rockfowl's mantle, back, rump, and uppertail coverts are all grey. The feathers on the rump are long, dense, and silky. Additionally, the tail is grey. The rockfowl's chin, throat, sides of the neck, and upper breast are all a pale grey. This bird is buffy lemon in colour on its lower breast, belly, flanks, thighs, and undertail coverts, though the flanks can sometimes appear to be greyish. The wing is grey, though the wing's remiges are black, forming a line between the lemon underparts and grey upperparts. Its legs and feet are silver-grey and muscular. The adult rockfowl weighs 200 to 250 grams (7.1 to 8.8 oz).

The nestling is born nearly featherless except for tiny primary quills and a fine down along its spine, humerus, forearm, and femur. Its skin is dark pink but displays variable black patches on its upperside. The gape is yellow. As the nestling develops, its plumage begins to resemble that of the adult, though it has white flecks on its wing coverts and the featherless skin on the head is black or dark brown, not powder blue, on the forecrown and dark reddish brown, not carmine, on the hindcrown. After fledging, the immature closely resembles the adult except for the bare patch on the back of the head being golden yellow instead of carmine and the tail being only a third as long as that of an adult.

The grey-necked rockfowl is a relatively silent species. It has been known to give a quiet, one to two second long, hissing "wheet" call several times at intervals of about four seconds. To give this call, the rockfowl opens its beak and inflates its throat. When bringing food to their nests, the adults give one or two "peep"s. After reaching the nest, the adult repeatedly makes a low "ga-a-a" sound that has been described as being between a snore and a sigh. It also makes a hissing noise that has been described as a "shisss".

== Distribution and habitat ==
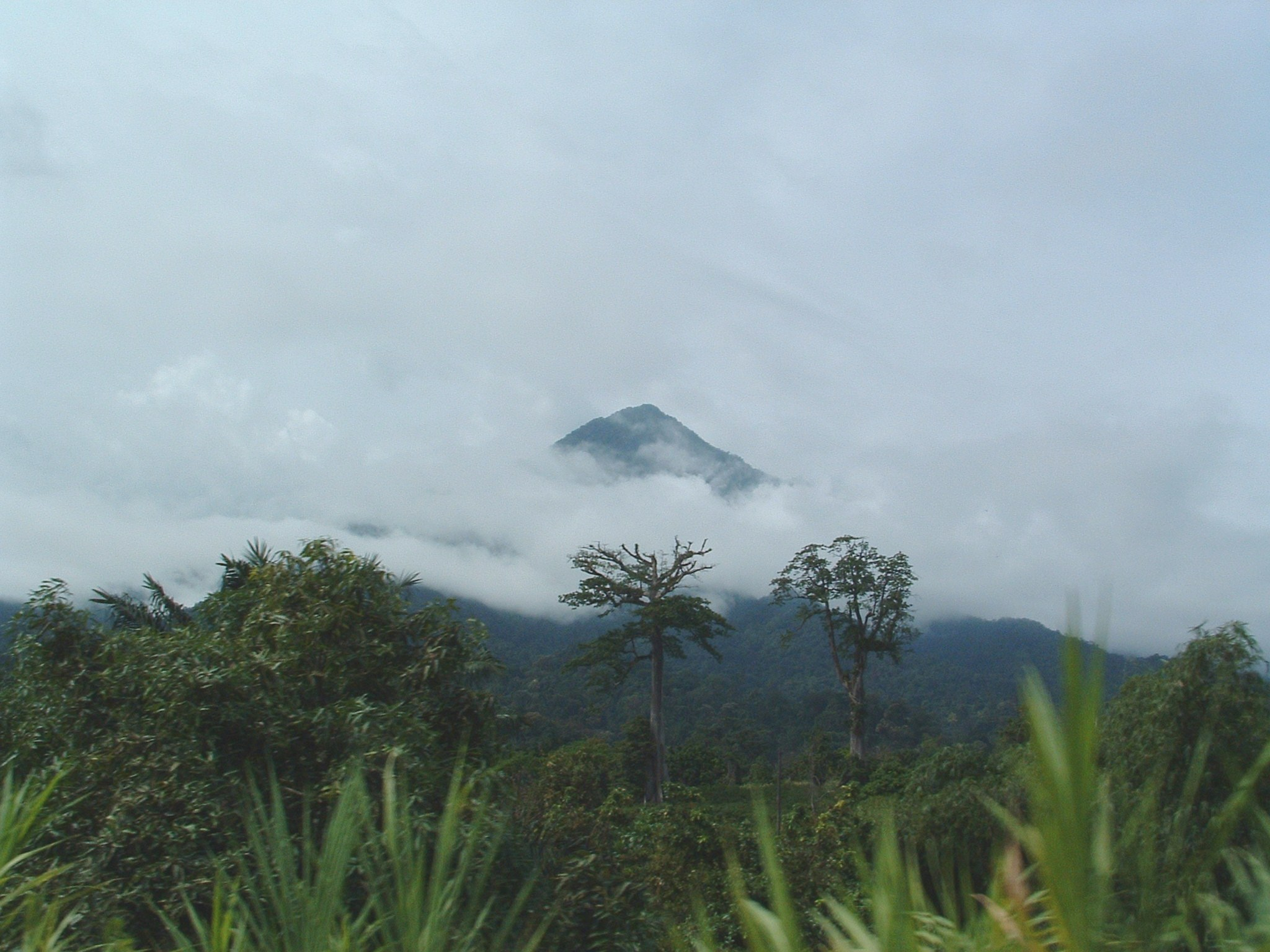
The forests around Mount Cameroon are a nesting area

The grey-necked rockfowl is found in West Africa from southeast Nigeria to southwest Gabon. In Nigeria, it is only found in the nation's southeastern corner near the coast and the Cameroon border. The species is widespread in southwestern Cameroon, and this country is considered to be the species' stronghold. It is found throughout Equatorial Guinea and into southwestern Gabon. Additionally, the species resides in the southwestern forests of the island of Bioko in the Gulf of Guinea. There is only one record of this species from the Republic of the Congo, though it is suspected that the rockfowl may have an undiscovered population in this country. The grey-necked rockfowl's total range covers approximately 314,000 square kilometres (121,000 sq mi).

The grey-necked rockfowl prefers rugged terrain in these forests covered in large boulders, caves, and gorges. Additionally, it often found near inselbergs and a source of water, either a river or a forest pool. The understory of its forests has sparse undergrowth or open spaces but is covered in mosses, ferns, lianas, and epiphytes. In southwestern Bioko it is found in low forests that receive nearly 10 metres (33 ft) of rain a year. Bioko's habitat also has dense undergrowth and vertical gorges near a caldera. The rockfowl's habitat is normally found between 450 and 2,100 metres (1,480 and 6,890 ft) above sea level, though it is lower in elevation on Bioko. This species is non-migratory, and at one site in Cameroon the birds remained within 300 metres (980 ft) of their nesting site throughout the year. It is capable of living near human activity, and one breeding site in Cameroon was located within 30 metres (98 ft) of a maize plot. This and other recent observations suggest that the rockfowl has greater tolerance for degraded habitat than previously thought.

== Ecology and behavior ==
This rockfowl usually lives either alone or in pairs, although small flocks of three to ten birds are not uncommon. It normally moves through its habitat in a series of runs and long, springing hops on the ground and in low branches. It uses its tail for balance while hopping and running. When in a flock, rockfowl hop almost in unison. In the unusual occurrences when the species does fly, it is fast and is capable of navigating through the trees and rocks well. When it is standing still, the rockfowl has its tail down and its head looking up. Typically, it silently evades any unusual movements in their forest. However, if these birds know that they have been sighted, they can become quite inquisitive and occasionally approach observers. This is not a shy species once it knows that it has been seen, and often studies things of interest, including humans, from an open location. When this species is suspicious, it raises the small crown on its head and the ruff on its neck while uttering a muffled groan. It is most active in the early morning and late evening, and from 10:30 am to 7:00 pm remains perched with little activity either in liana-tangled areas or in caves away from the nests. To scratch its head, the species lifts its foot over its head. It bathes in small pools. While its lifespan in the wild is unknown, it has lived up to 25 years in captivity.

=== Diet ===
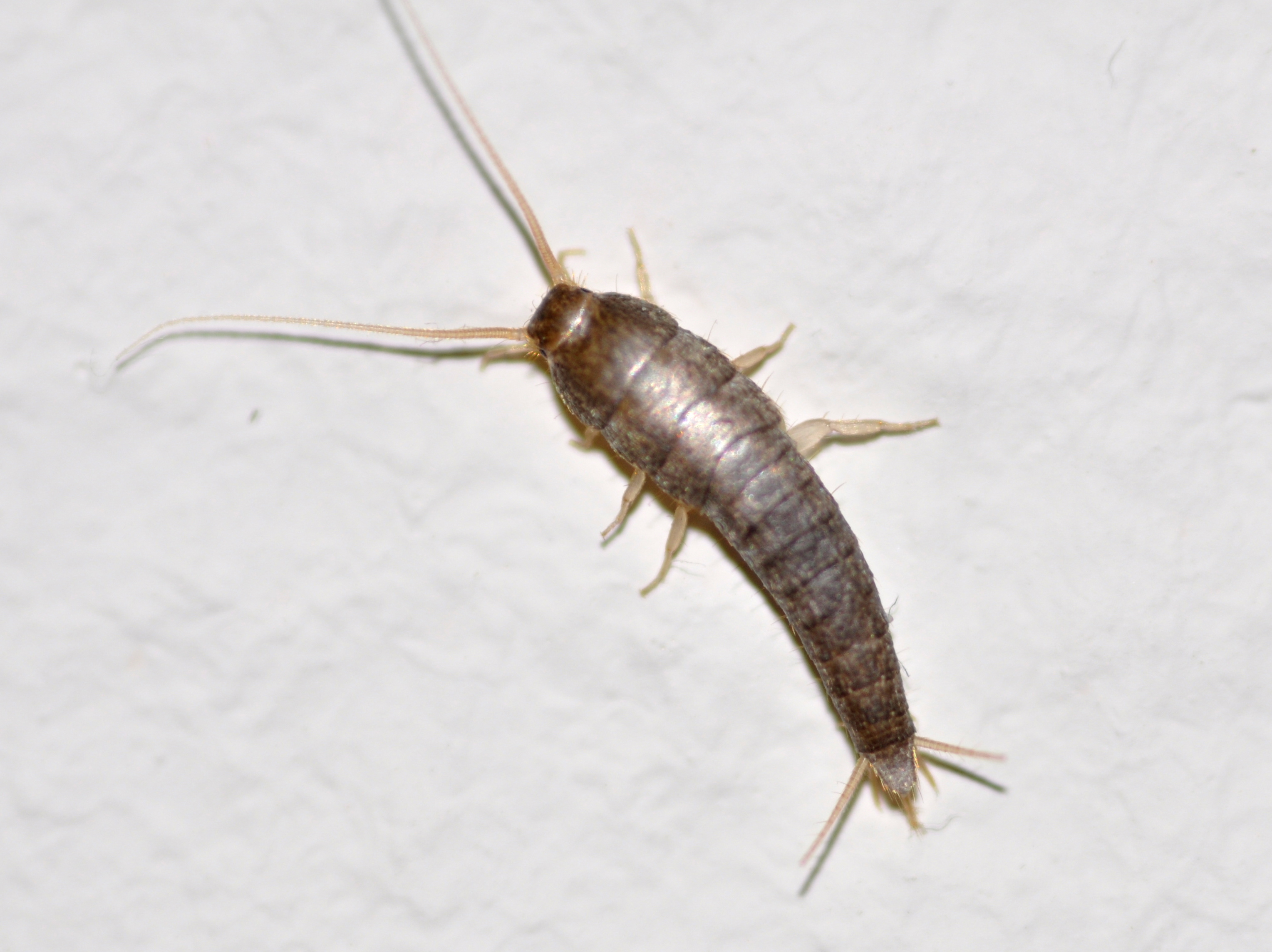
A silverfish, one of the rockfowl's prey items

This species forages in the early morning or late afternoon either alone or in small groups in leaf litter and on dead tree trunks. It is also known to leap upwards to grab prey on overhanging foliage. It looks for its prey either by standing still and scanning the surrounding area or by tossing the leaf litter away with its beak. It also frequently follows columns of Dorylus ants, feeding on the insects flushed by the ants. It also is known to hunt in streams for crabs and fish. It crushes snails with its beak and, if its prey struggles, smashes it against the ground. While an uncommon occurrence, male rockfowl have been observed giving food to a female.

The grey-necked rockfowl feeds on a diverse range of invertebrates and small vertebrates, though plant matter does constitute a major part of its diet. It is known to eat beetles, including weevils, rove beetles, and click beetles from the genus Psephus, butterflies, ants from the genera Dorylus and Pachycondyla, grasshoppers, cockroaches from the family Blattidae, earwigs, caterpillars, ant-lions, silverfish, and earthworms. Small lizards, frogs, snails, and slugs are also eaten, as are crabs from the genus Potamon, fruits, flower buds, mosses, and leaves. Fish have also been identified as a prey item in Nigeria. At at least one nesting site, it relies heavily on the arthropods feeding on the bat guano near the cave for sustenance, while this behaviour has been reported to a lesser extent at other sites. It is known to regurgitate what it has eaten in pellet form. Overall, between 52 and 60 percent of the bird's diet is believed to be composed of animals. Rove beetle larvae and ants were the most frequently eaten prey in a study in Nigeria.

=== Reproduction ===
The grey-necked rockfowl breeds either alone or in small colonies averaging two to five nests in size, though nearly fifty nests are present at one site. It is monogamous and therefore does not breed with rockfowl other than its mate. It is believed to breed cooperatively in Equatorial Guinea, as four different birds were observed feeding one nest. The rockfowl's courtship displays are unknown. The timing of the egg laying in a colony is not synchronized, leading to various stages of development of nestlings within the colony. It has been suggested that this is to promote cooperative breeding. The laying dates also vary by region, typically coinciding with a few weeks before the onset of the wet season; in areas where the wet season is bimodal, two different breeding seasons occur. However, in mountainous regions such as Mount Cameroon, it breeds during the dry season to avoid the frequent mists of the wet season. Birds in Nigeria lay their eggs between August and November, birds in Gabon lay between November and April, birds in western Cameroon lay between March and November with peaks of June, July, and October, and birds in southern Cameroon have two breeding seasons, a main one from October to December and a secondary one lasting from April to May. In Equatorial Guinea, nesting occurs in mid-February.

This rockfowl builds its nest onto the sides of rocks, normally in caves, where nests are built both by the entrance and deep within, or on nearly vertical cliff faces, which can be either bare or have some vegetation, though never woody branches, near the nest. Nests need to be built under an overhang to protect it from water, and the rock surface normally slopes forward slightly. The nests are almost always found near water, which can be in the form of either streams or forest pools. These streams, particularly those located at the base of a nesting cliff, help keep predators away from the nests. Nests on rock surfaces are normally built 1.2 to 5.2 metres (3.9 to 17.1 ft) above the ground. In addition to the rock face nests, there is a record of a nest being constructed on the buttress root of a Piptadeniastrum tree above a small stream. Two nests were even built onto a concrete bridge in Gabon's Lopé National Park. The male and female rockfowl work equally on the nest's construction, and it can take two to three months to build one, though in some extreme cases it takes more than a year. The nest itself is a half-cup constructed of dry mud with grass fibres and dead leaves mixed in, often with the plant matter sticking out of the nest's walls. It is either built onto the rock surface or, in some cases, is built more like a retaining wall across the opening of a small rock fissure. Nests are built at least away 1 metre (3.3 ft) from each other, and in some cases up to 5 metres (16 ft). The nest is normally 30 to 40 centimetres (12 to 16 in) thick, though the nest is uneven in its construction and one nest was 140 centimetres (55 in) thick. It is about 290 centimetres (110 in) wide and 400 centimetres (160 in) long and weighs about 3 kilograms (6.6 lb). However, nest sizes do have a large degree of variability. After the mud dries, it becomes a very hard structure. The inside of the nest is lined with rootlets and thin strips of grass.

One to three eggs, normally two, are laid, with the second egg being laid between 24 and 48 hours after the first. The eggs are variable in coloration and can be a light yellow-brown with dark brown blotches, creamy white with dark brown or grey blotches, or pale grey with brown mottling. The eggs weigh about 15.2 grams (0.54 oz) and have an average size of 40.5 millimetres (1.59 in) by 27.5 millimetres (1.08 in). The rockfowl begins to incubate after both eggs are laid. The time the rockfowl spends incubating varies greatly, though it is mostly for less than five minutes at a time with nearly two hours between sessions. Both the male and female rockfowl incubate. When the incubating bird's mate comes, it gives a brief call that causes the incubating bird to leave the nest. In the two days prior to hatching, the adult rockfowl prods at the eggs, sometimes with food in its beak. Incubation lasts for 21 to 24 days. When the infants hatch, they hatch about a day apart. The adult rockfowl quickly remove the eggshell fragments from the nest. The newborn weighs only 12 grams (0.42 oz) after hatching, but it quickly gains weight. The eyes open and the tail begins to grow on the fifth day. During the first couple of days, food is brought to the nestlings three to six times an hour, peaking in the evening. Begging nestlings expose their beak and gape to their parent, though they do not make a sound. The second-hatched nestling often fails to gain weight and dies, and there is evidence suggesting that the adults cannibalize the remains. For the first ten days after hatching, one adult rockfowl stays and guards the nestlings while the other collects food; despite this, nests have been destroyed by chimpanzees and drills. The chicks leave the nest after 24 days. Infanticide has been recorded in this species, with rockfowl killing other rockfowl's young. In one case, a second pair of rockfowl moved onto a nest after killing the first pair's nestlings.

== Relationship with humans ==
In Cameroon, the grey-necked rockfowl is respected by the indigenous peoples and, in some cases, even feared. It is known by many names to the indigenous peoples of Nigeria, with most of the translating to "bird of the rocks" or "fowl of the stream". Hunters sheltering in the rockfowl's nesting caves have been known to kill and eat adult rockfowl, though it is generally thought to be too small to eat and is left for children to hunt. In the 1950s and 1960s, western zoos desired this species, leading to a large demand to collect the rockfowl for display. British conservationist and author Gerald Durrell made this species a target on two of his trips to Cameroon, which he describes in The Bafut Beagles and A Zoo in My Luggage. The trade of this species is non-existent today, and, as the zoo population did not sustain itself despite sporadic breeding, the last captive rockfowl died at the Frankfurt Zoo in 2009. The grey-necked rockfowl has been depicted on numerous postage stamps from Cameroon and Nigeria, as well as stamps from Benin and Togo, where it does not live. It is considered one of the most difficult species of bird to see in the wild. The grey-necked rockfowl is a symbol for both conservation and ecotourism efforts in its range. This species is considered one of the five most desirable birds in Africa by ornithologists.

=== Conservation ===
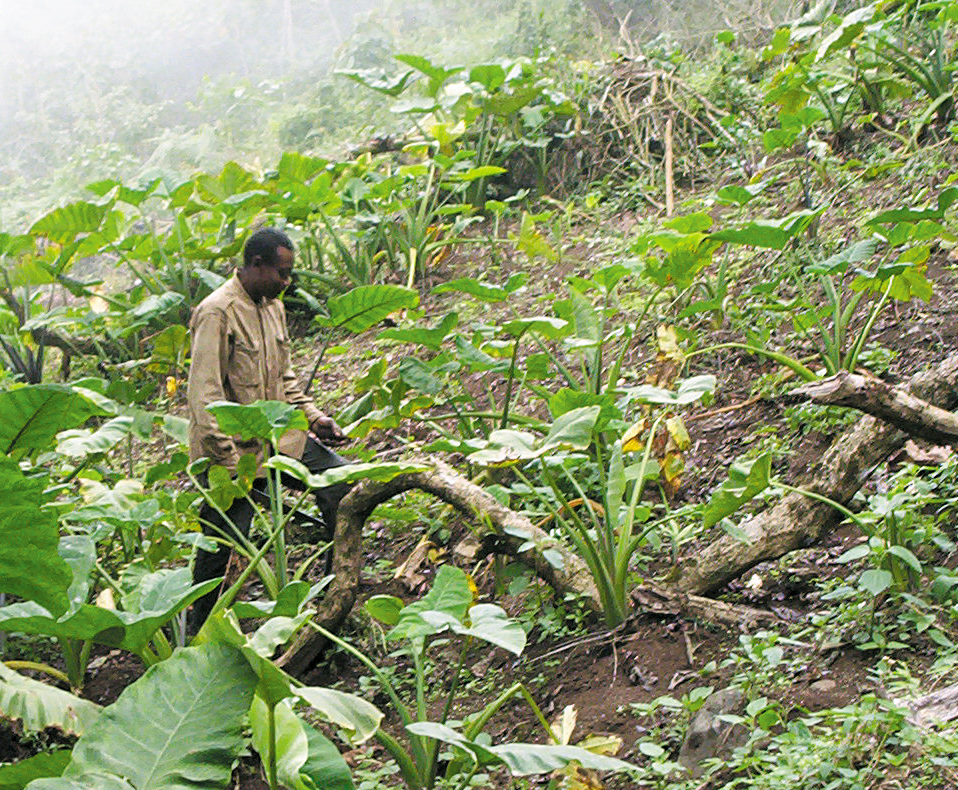
A farmer's field on Mount Cameroon

The grey-necked rockfowl is considered to be vulnerable due to habitat destruction, its isolated populations, collection of adults, predation, and a low breeding success rate. Its habitat is being destroyed to create large agricultural fields and cocoa plantations, as well as for logging and slash-and-burn agriculture. Due to the highly specialized requirements for its habitat, its population is very fragmented, and the species is believed to be naturally rare. Competition for its nesting sites is a result of these strict requirements and can lead to infanticide. Its estimated population is between 2,500 and 10,000 individuals, though it is believed that the population is at the lower end of the estimate. However, due to the inaccessibility of some parts of its range, it is also possible that this species is more common than believed. The population of some of these colonies is reaching the minimum levels needed for long-term viability. It also falls victim to spring traps set for mammals by hunters. However, a more serious threat to its numbers was the widespread collection of rockfowl for display in zoos in the 1950s and 1960s. There is a risk that it will be negatively affected by ecotourism due to disturbances in its daily routine if proper viewing procedures are not followed.

Cameroon is the only nation with a national law protecting this species. This law prohibits killing the rockfowl, though it can be captured with a proper permit. International trading of the grey-necked rockfowl is governed under CITES Appendix I, meaning that legal trading of this species is only authorized in extraordinary circumstances. In 2006 BirdLife International drafted an international action plan to provide strategies for protecting this species. This plan focused on surveying the remaining habitat, raising awareness amongst the local populace, and limiting the continued destruction of its habitat.

This rockfowl is protected in some of the areas in which it lives by national parks. Additionally, there seems to be little habitat destruction in Gabon and on Bioko as the locations in these places in which the rockfowl lives is believed to be too inaccessible for future human development. Recent surveys have also discovered new populations of the grey-necked rockfowl.
