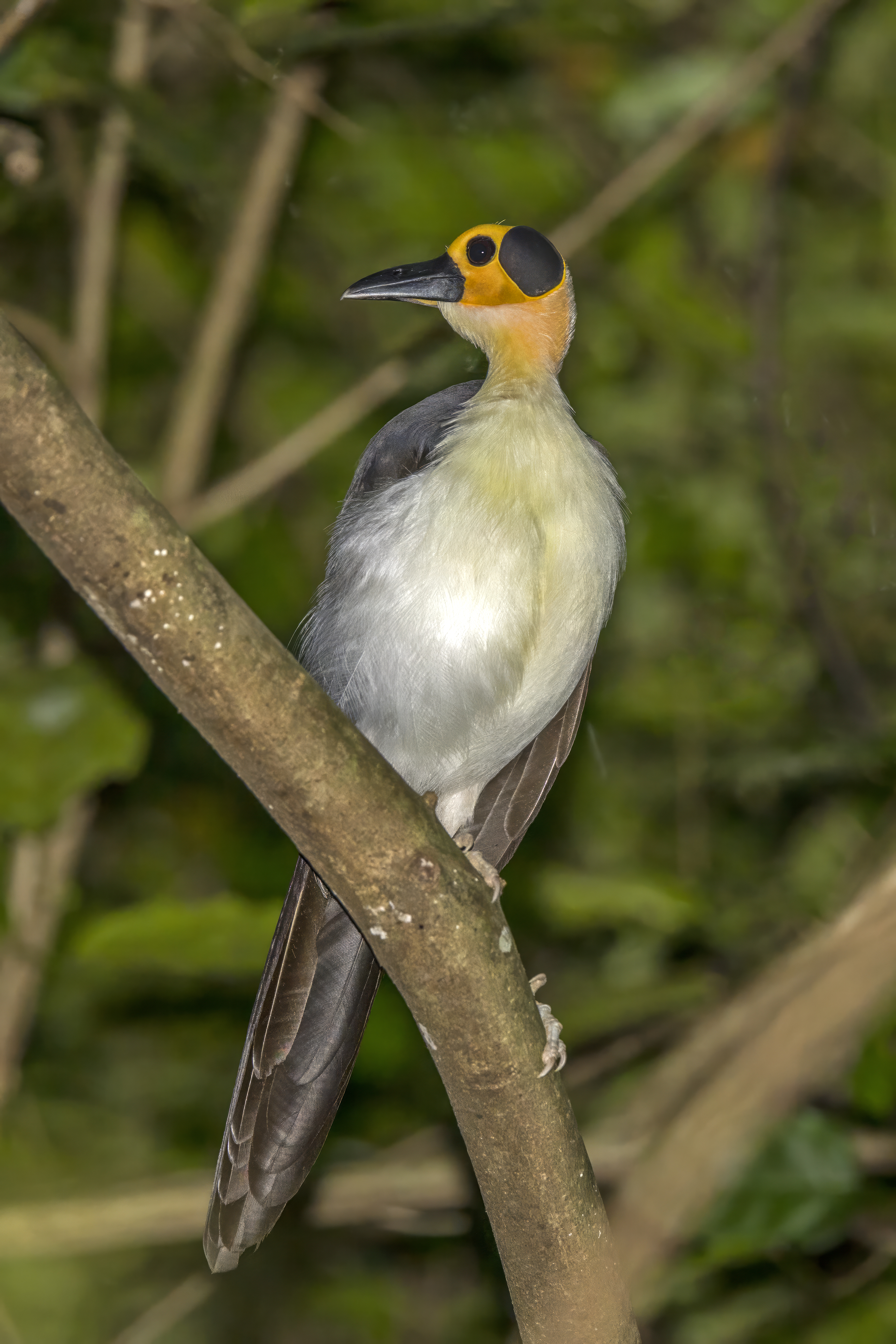
- White-necked rockfowl (P. gymnocephalus), Ghana

Scientific classification
- Kingdom: Animalia
- Phylum: Chordata
- Class: Aves
- Order: Passeriformes
- Infraorder: Passerides
- Family: Picathartidae; Lowe, 1938
- Genus: Picathartes; Lesson, 1828

Species
- P. gymnocephalus P. oreas
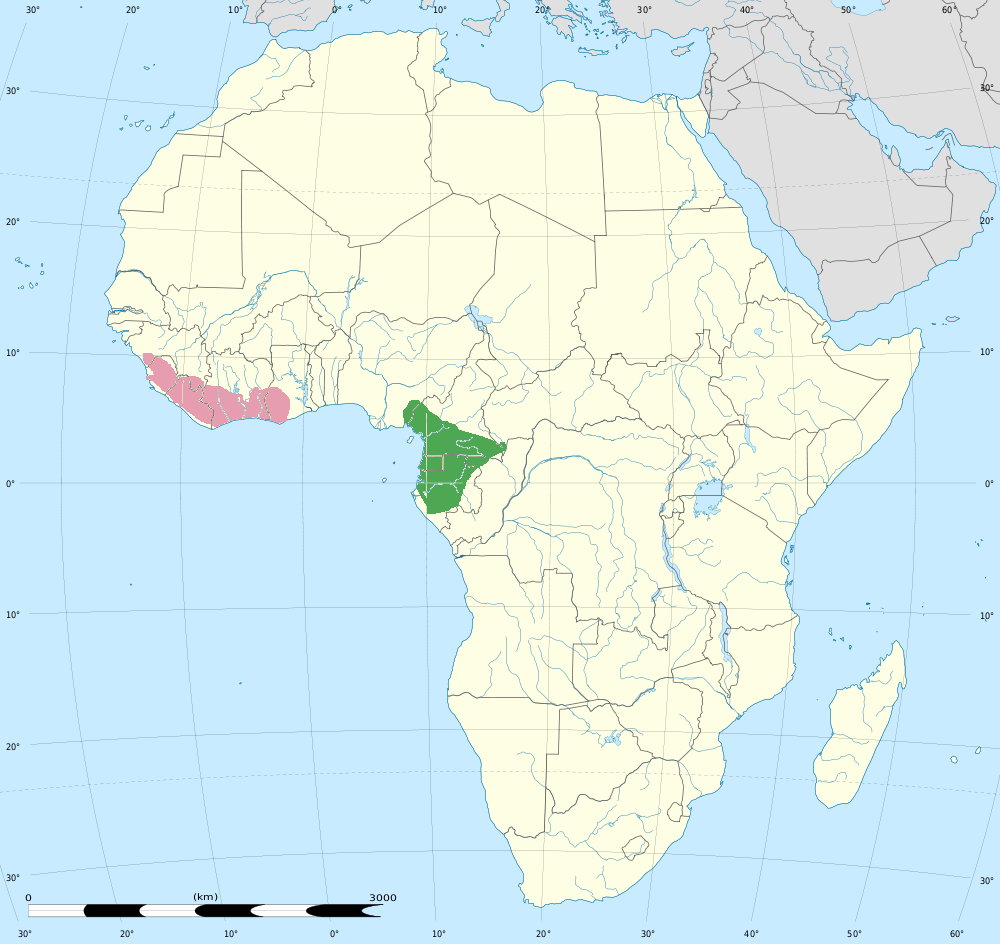
- White-necked (pink) and grey-necked (green) rockfowl distribution

Synonyms
- Galgulus Wagler, 1827 (non Brisson, 1760: preoccupied)

= Picathartes =

Picathartes Temporal range: Lutetian–Present

Genus of birds

The picathartes, rockfowl, or bald crows are a small genus of two passerine bird species forming the family Picathartidae found in the rain-forests of tropical west and central Africa. They have unfeathered heads, and feed on insects and other invertebrates picked from damp rocky areas. Both species are totally non-migratory, being dependent on a specialised rocky jungle habitat. Both species are listed as vulnerable to extinction on the IUCN Red List.

== Taxonomy and systematics ==
The taxonomic position of the clade and its two species has been confusing. At various times, it has been grouped with the babblers, flycatchers, starlings, crows and others before being placed in a family of its own. Serle in 1952 thought it resembled the Asian genus Eupetes while Sibley used egg-albumin protein similarity, determined by electrophoresis, to suggest that it belonged to the Timaliidae. Olson revived the idea that it was related to Eupetes in 1979. A molecular sequence based study suggests that it may indeed be closely related to the crows and placed somewhere at the boundary between the Passerida and Corvida. More specifically they appear to be a sister of the rockjumpers (Chaetops) and are basal to the clade containing the Sylvioidea, Passeroidea and Muscicapoidea but outside the core Corvoidea.

This generic name comes from a combination of the Latin genera pica for "magpie" and cathartes for "vulture".

=== Species ===
Image	Common name	Scientific name	Distribution
	White-necked rockfowl	Picathartes gymnocephalus	West Africa from Guinea to Ghana, mainly rocky forested areas at higher altitudes.
	Grey-necked rockfowl	Picathartes oreas	Southwest Nigeria through Cameroon, Equatorial Guinea, and southwest Gabon, mainly rocky areas of close-canopied rainforest.

A possible third species may exist in Uganda, in the vicinity of the Kazinga Channel, linking Lake Edward with Lake George.

== Description ==
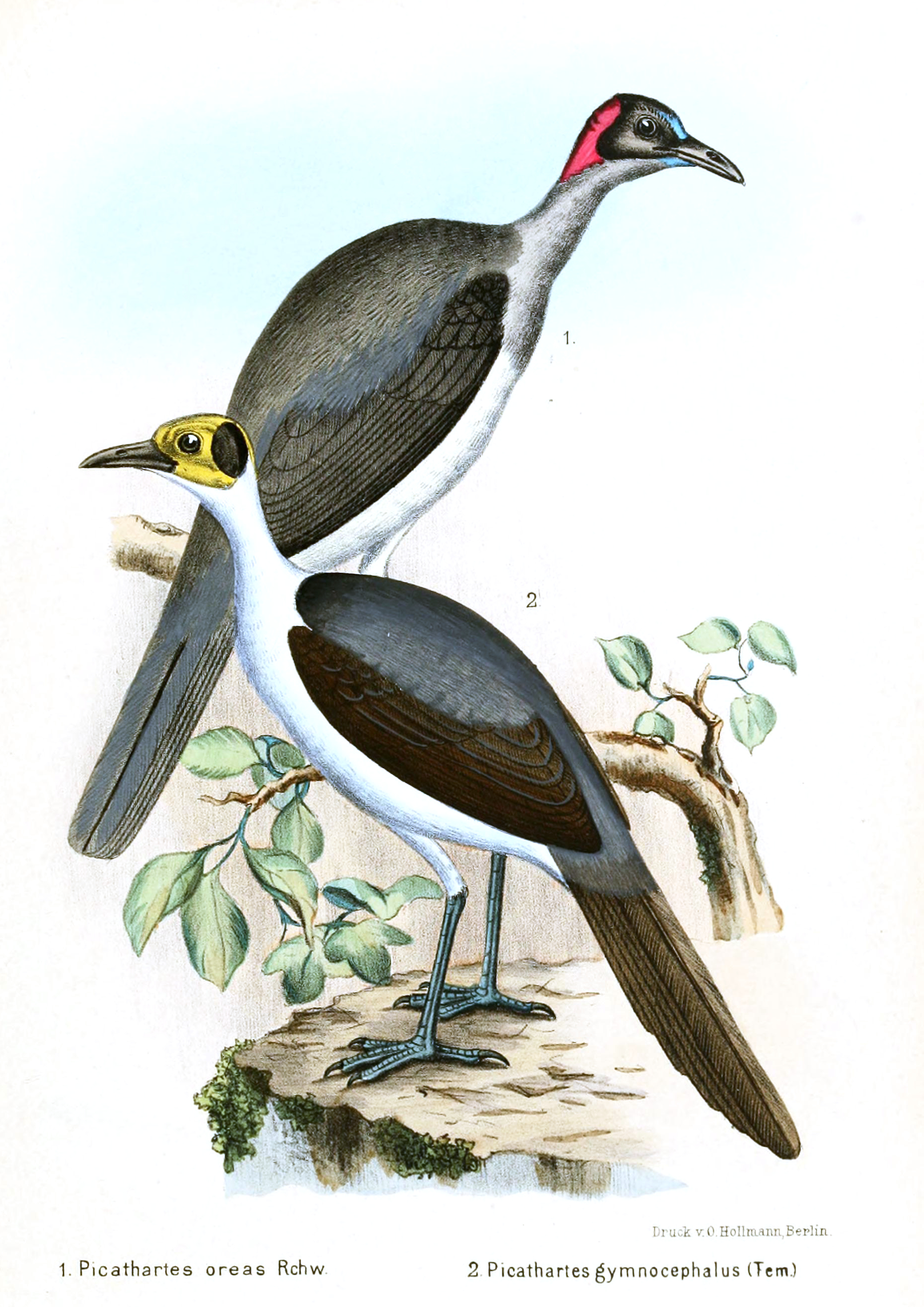
A 1902 illustration of the two species

The picathartes are large 33 to 38 cm (13 to 15 in) long passerines with crow-like black bills, long neck, tail, and legs. They weigh between 200 and 250 g (7.1 and 8.8 oz). The strong feet and grey legs are adapted to terrestrial movement, and the family progresses through the forest with long bounds on the ground. The wings are long but are seldom used for long flights. The plumage is similar between the two species, with white breasts and bellies and darker grey and grey-black wings, backs, and tails. The neck color varies between the two species, giving them their individual names (grey-necked and white-necked picathartes). They also have bald heads with brightly coloured and patterned skin.

== Behaviour and ecology ==
Rockfowl are generalised feeders, taking a wide range of invertebrate prey. Prey items include a range of insects, particularly beetles, termites, and ants, as well as millipedes, centipedes, earthworms, and gastropods. Frogs and lizards are also taken, but these are mostly fed to their chicks. Prey is taken both by foraging on the ground and in the trees. They will also forage in shallow flowing water for crabs. When foraging on the ground, they move forward with hops and bounds, then pausing to search for prey. The longish bill is used to turn over leaves and seize prey, but the feet are never used for either. Both species will follow swarms of ants in order to snatch prey fleeing the ants.

Both species of rockfowl breed seasonally in the wet season. Where an area experiences two wet seasons in a year, they will breed twice in that year. Despite reports of cooperative breeding, it is now thought that they are exclusively monogamous, breeding in pairs. They are also commonly reported to be colonial, and will breed in colonies of up to seven pairs, but solitary breeders and smaller colonies of just two pairs are more common. The nest is made of mud attached to a cave roof or overhanging rock on a cliff. The nest is a cup-like structure of dried leaves, twigs and plant fibres set into dried mud. Two eggs are laid, 24 to 48 hours apart. Both parents participate in incubating the eggs, each taking a 12-hour shift before being relieved by its partner. It takes around 20 days for the eggs to hatch. Picathartes hatchlings are altricial at hatching, almost naked (a few feathers are present on the crown and back) and helpless. The chicks take around 25 days to fledge.

== Distribution and habitat ==
The rockfowl are distributed in West Africa and western Central Africa, in Guinea, Sierra Leone, Liberia, Ivory Coast, Ghana (white-necked rockfowl), Nigeria, Cameroon, Equatorial Guinea, Gabon, the Republic of the Congo, and the Central African Republic (grey-necked rockfowl). The rockfowl live in lowland rainforest at up to 800 m, in rocky and hilly terrain on the slopes of hills and mountains. These birds require forest litter for foraging, a large enough area to contain army-ant swarms (Dorylinae), and rocks, cliffs, or caves for nesting sites.
