= List of provinces of Papua New Guinea by Human Development Index =

This is a list of Provinces of Papua New Guinea by Human Development Index as of 2023.

Rank	Province	HDI (2023)
High Human Development
1	National Capital District	0.749
Medium Human Development
2	Manus	0.632
3	East New Britain	0.621
4	New Ireland	0.620
5	Bougainville	0.614
6	Morobe	0.614
7	West New Britain	0.613
8	Western Highlands	0.606
9	Chimbu	0.592
10	Central	0.589
11	Western	0.583
12	Milne Bay	0.580
13	Madang	0.578
–	Papua New Guinea	0.576
14	Oro	0.567
15	Jiwaka	0.566
16	East Sepik	0.571
Low Human Development
17	Sandaun	0.550
18	Eastern Highlands	0.544
19	Gulf	0.541
20	Enga	0.511
21	Southern Highlands	0.511
22	Hela	0.480
