= Charles Lagus =

Czech photographer and film maker (born 1928)

Charles Lagus (born 8 September 1928, in Prague, Czechoslovakia) is a Czech photographer and film maker. Lagus was the first cameraman engaged by the BBC to shoot natural history footage, and worked with David Attenborough on his early Zoo Quest series in 1954.

== Life and career ==
Lagus' career as a film-maker began in 1946 when he switched from studying medicine to photography, and began making medical and scientific research films for Imperial Chemical Industries (ICI).

In 1954, aged 26, he did his first work for the BBC, on David Attenborough's Zoo Quest in Sierra Leone, the series which would launch his career. Lagus eventually worked on most episodes of the series, and also worked in Australia on Peter Scott's Faraway Look in 1957. In 1959 he directed the documentary Kariba, following attempts to rescue animals during the construction and flooding of the Kariba Dam between Zambia and Zimbabwe. Lagus also wrote a book about the topic entitled Operation Noah.

Other nature programmes that Lagus worked on included Anglia Television's Lure of the Dolphin in 1976, the BBC's Animal Magic and ITV's Nature Watch. He also worked on other shows including Z-Cars (1964) and Jane Eyre (1963).

Between 1982 and 1989 he was a lecturer at the National Film and Television School, and in 1984 he was elected as a member of the British Society of Cinematographers (BSC). In 1986 Lagus received the "Lifetime Achievement Panda" for services to wildlife film-making at the Wildscreen Film Festival in Bristol, United Kingdom.

He now lives in Mauritius.
