= Kol Rural LLG =

Local-level government in Papua New Guinea

- Location within Papua New Guinea
- Coordinates: 5.731197°S 144.848057°E
- Country: Papua New Guinea
- Province: Jiwaka Province
- Time zone: UTC+10 (AEST)

Kol Rural LLG is a local-level government (LLG) of Jiwaka Province, Papua New Guinea.

== Wards ==
1. Maipka/Kol Station
2. Wamku
3. Kuimin
4. Meginapol
5. Mongom
6. Maime
7. Kunomol
8. Kuma
9. Gebal
10. Iwaramul
11. Dungo
12. Bubulsinga
13. Omun
14. Kalimbkul
15. Bubkale
16. Bial
17. Kosap
18. Kurunga
19. Kaulo
20. Mokuna
21. Yambdop
22. Waramanz 1
23. Waramanz 2
24. Gakip
25. Junk/Arbid
