= North Waghi Rural LLG =

Local-level government in Papua New Guinea

- Country: Papua New Guinea
- Province: Jiwaka Province
- Time zone: UTC+10 (AEST)

North Waghi Rural LLG is a local-level government (LLG) of Jiwaka Province, Papua New Guinea.

== North Waghi Wards/Census Units(CUs): ==
N/Waghi Rural LLG:

1. Kimil 1: 14 CUs
2. Kimil 2: 12 CUs
3. Bung 1: 13 CUs
4. Koskala 2: 8 CUs
5. Koskala 1: 7 CUs
6. Kakinjep 1: 15 CUs
7. Molka 1: 6 CUs
8. Kwiena 1: 11 CUs
9. Kwiena 2: 7 CUs
10. Dumbola 1: 14 CUs
11. Talu 1: 11 CUs
12. Kendu 1: 9 CUs
13. Bolimba 1: 8 CUs
14. Bung 2: 6 CUs
15. Bung 3: 9 CUs
16. Koskala 3: 11 CUs
17. Kakinjep 2: 6 CUs
18. Molka 2: 11 CUs
19. Dumbola 2: 7 CUs
20. Talu 2: 14 CUs
21. Kendu 2: 25 CUs
22. Bolimba 2: 4 CUs
23. Banz : 4 CUs
