= Jimi Rural LLG =

Local-level government in Papua New Guinea

- Location within Papua New Guinea
- Coordinates: 5.569576°S 144.659631°E
- Country: Papua New Guinea
- Province: Jiwaka Province
- Time zone: UTC+10 (AEST)

Jimi Rural LLG is a local-level government (LLG) of Jiwaka Province, Papua New Guinea.

== Wards ==
1. Mogini
2. Koriom
3. Kwiop
4. Togoban
5. Kwima
6. Kupeng
7. Kompiai
8. Tswenkai
9. Bokopai
10. Yumbigema
11. Koinambe
12. Kandabiamb
13. Tsembant
14. Gunjiji
15. Gondobend
16. Waim
17. Tsarep
18. Marent
19. Tsendiap
20. Tumbunki
21. Runimp
22. Wum
23. Tsenga
24. Maikmol
25. Toli
26. Ongolmol
27. Kaul
28. Karap
29. Manemp
30. Magin
31. Korenju
32. Tabibuga
33. Tsingoropa
34. Kwipun
35. Telta
36. Menjim 2
