= Jimi District =

- District
- Location within Papua New Guinea
- Coordinates: 5.553°S 144.576°E
- Country: Papua New Guinea
- Province: Jiwaka Province
- Capital: Tabibuga

Area
  - Total: 1,970 km^{2} (760 sq mi)

Population (2011 census)
  - Total: 71,379
  - Density: 36.2/km^{2} (93.8/sq mi)
- Time zone: UTC+10 (AEST)

Jimi District is a district of the Jiwaka Province of Papua New Guinea. Its capital is Tabibuga. The population of the district was 71,379 at the 2011 census. Before May 2012, it was part of the Western Highlands Province. It is home to the Jimi Valley and the village of Koinambe.

The district contains two local-level governments (LLGs): Jimi Rural and Kol Rural.
