= South Waghi Rural LLG =

Local-level government in Papua New Guinea

- Location within Papua New Guinea
- Coordinates: 5.90932°S 144.683201°E
- Country: Papua New Guinea
- Province: Jiwaka Province
- Time zone: UTC+10 (AEST)

South Waghi Rural LLG is a local-level government (LLG) of Jiwaka Province, Papua New Guinea.

== Wards ==
1. Aviamp 3
2. Aviamp 4
3. Aviamp 2
4. Aviamp 1
5. Kauwi
6. Kabagang
7. Kungar 2
8. Kungar 1
9. Kudjip Plnt
10. Kudjip Hospital
11. Puri
12. Kurumul 1
13. Kurumul 2
14. Tombil 1
15. Tombil 2
16. Kamang 1
17. Kamang 2
18. Anginmol
19. Ngunba Tsents
20. Gabinal
21. Alua
22. Gagwa / Dup
23. Kamang 3 / Mondomil
24. Olubus
25. Pabamil
26. Tsigmil
27. Begbe
28. Tumba
29. Numgil
30. Kugmar
31. Gugmar
32. Djek
33. Yeu 1
34. Mt. Au
35. Ambopane
36. Yeu 2
37. Olate
38. Palti
39. Tesa
40. Wusinge
41. Meru
42. Tandambak
43. Tun
44. Kupa
45. Djeck 2
46. Minj Mu
47. Kia
48. Minj Urban
