= Wake Goi =

Papua New Guinea politician

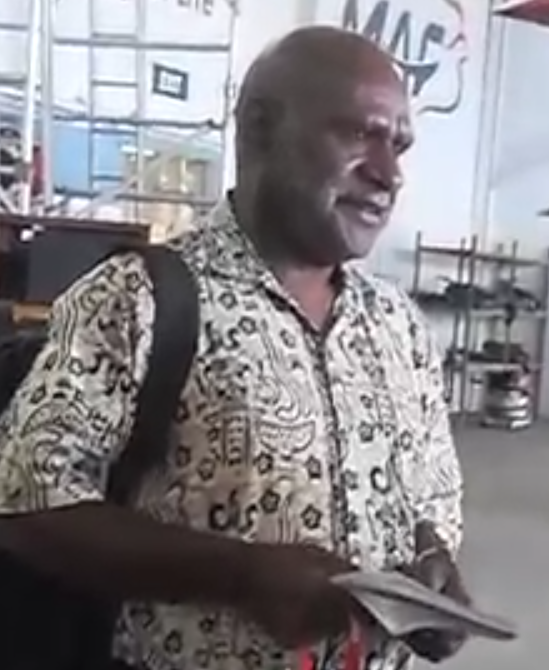
Goi in 2018

Wake Goi (born 6 October 1968) is a Papua New Guinea politician. He was a member of the National Parliament of Papua New Guinea from 2007 to 2012, representing the electorate of Jimi Open.

In 2007, he defeated Francis Kunai, who had been the member for the seat since 2002.

In August 2011, Peter O'Neill became Prime Minister in the wake of a parliamentary motion of no confidence in the government of Acting Prime Minister Sam Abal (standing in for Sir Michael Somare while the latter was hospitalised for a heart condition). O'Neill appointed Goi as his Minister Assisting the Prime Minister on Constitutional Matters.
