= Jiwaka Province =

Jiwaka Province Jiwaka Provins (Tok Pisin)
- Province
- Flag

- Jiwaka Province in Papua New Guinea
- Coordinates: 6°0′S 144°35′E
- Country: Papua New Guinea
- Formation: 2012
- Capital: Kurumul
- Districts: List: Anglimp-South Waghi District; Jimi District; North Waghi District

Government
  - Governor: Simon Kaiwi (2022-)

Area
  - Total: 4,798 km^{2} (1,853 sq mi)

Population (2011 census)
  - Total: 343,987
  - Density: 71.69/km^{2} (185.7/sq mi)
- Time zone: UTC+10 (AEST)
- HDI (2018): 0.539 low · 15th of 22

Jiwaka is a province of Papua New Guinea. The government gazetted provincial capital is located in Kurumul. Temporarily all provincial matters are handled in Minj after the election of the new Governor in 2022 general elections. Matters concerning each district are dealt with at their respective district administration office.

The province covers an area of 4,798 km², and there are 343,987 inhabitants (2011 census final figures—2000 census 185,641). Jiwaka province officially came into being on 17 May 2012, comprising three districts previously part of Western Highlands Province. Mount Wilhelm, the tallest mountain in Papua New Guinea, is on the border of Jiwaka.

== Etymology ==
"Jiwaka" is a portmanteau word combining the first two letters each from the word Jimi, Waghi and Kambia. Jimi, Waghi and Kambia denote the topographical landscape referencing the Valley (Waghi Valley) and the mountain ranges at the north (Jimi) and south (Kambia).

== Districts and LLGs ==
There are eight LLGs in Jiwaka's four districts of Minj, Banz, Nondugl and Jiimi. Anglimp rural, Kudjip rural, Minj rural, Minj urban, Nondugl, Banz urban, Banz rural, and Jimi LLGS. districts in the province. Each district has one or more Local Level Government (LLG) areas. For census purposes, the LLG areas are subdivided into wards and those into census units.

District	District Capital	LLG Name
Anglimp-South Waghi District	Minj	Anglimp Rural
Anglimp-South Waghi District	Minj	South Waghi Rural
Jimi District	Tabibuga	Jimi Rural
Jimi District	Tabibuga	Kol Rural
North Waghi District	Banz	North Waghi Rural
North Waghi District	Banz	Nondugl Rural

== Provincial leaders ==
=== Chairman of the Jiwaka Transitional Authority (2010–2012) ===
Philip Kapal was later Knighted for his service to PNG politics and the people of Jiwaka.

His term as Chairman during the transitional period has never been smooth. He was met with stiff opposition from individuals with vested political interest. Late Jamie Maxtone-Graham who was member for Anglimp South Waghi moved a 'Private Member's bill in Parliament to have sitting members as Chairman. That law was passed and Benjamin Mul who was North Waghi MP got the nod following rigorous lobbying by Mul and Jamie's cohorts. Following that, there was a spate of court battles leading to the inaugural general elections in 2012.

Chairman	Term
Philip Kapal	2010–2011

=== Governors (2012–present) ===
Governor	Term
William Tongamp	2012–2022
Simon Kaiwi	2022-present

== Members of the National Parliament ==
The province and each district is represented by a Member of the National Parliament. There is one provincial electorate and each district is an open electorate.

Electorate	Member
Jiwaka Provincial	Simon Kaiwi
Anglimp-South Waghi Open	Joe Kuli
Jimi Open	Wake Goi
North Waghi Open	Benjamin Mul

== Geography ==
Jiwaka is located in a very fertile land (Waghi Valley). The Waghi River runs between the valley and most of the people benefit out of it. Besides the Waghi River, the land is naturally fertile and people harvest the best food from it. The 3 resources of the Jiwaka people are coffee, tea and human resources. (SKM-Manda Dam-Tukoi)
