= Pooley =

Pooley is a surname. Notable people with the surname include:

- Charles Edward Pooley (1845–1912), Canadian lawyer and politician
- Christiane Pooley (born 1983), Chilean visual artist
- David Pooley, American football coach
- Dean Pooley (born 1986), English footballer
- Don Pooley (born 1951), American golfer
- Edmund Poley or Pooley (1544–1613), English Member of Parliament
- Elsa Pooley (born 1947), South African botanist
- Emma Pooley (born 1982), English cyclist
- Ernest Pooley (1876–1966), British arts administrator
- Fred Pooley (1916–1998), English architect
- Ginger Pooley (born 1977), American rock musician
- Guy Pooley (born 1965), English rower
- Ian Pooley (born 1973), German musician
- Isobel Pooley (born 1992), British high jumper
- Jason Pooley (born 1969), English cricketer
- Kristopher Pooley (born 1976), American rock musician
- Leanne Pooley, New Zealand film producer
- Olaf Pooley (1914-2015), English actor
- Paul Pooley (born 1960), Canadian ice hockey player
- Robert Henry Pooley (1878–1954), Canadian lawyer and politician
- Ted Pooley (1842–1907), English cricketer
- Thomas Pooley (c. 1788–1846), English property developer
- Tony Pooley (1938–2004), South African naturalist and conservationist
- William Pooley (died 1629), English landowner and politician

== See also ==
- Pooley Hall, country house in Warwickshire, England
- Pooley Sword, English sword manufacturing company
- Pooley Bridge, village in Cumbria, England
- Pooley Island, island in British Columbia, Canada
- Henry Pooley & Son Ltd, English weighing machine manufacturer
