= Tagulis granulosus =

Tagulis crab spider

Scientific classification
- Kingdom: Animalia
- Phylum: Arthropoda
- Subphylum: Chelicerata
- Class: Arachnida
- Order: Araneae
- Infraorder: Araneomorphae
- Family: Thomisidae
- Genus: Tagulis
- Species: T. granulosus

Binomial name
- Tagulis granulosus Simon, 1895

Species of crab spider

Tagulis granulosus is a species of crab spider in the family Thomisidae. It is found in Sierra Leone, Cameroon, Angola, and South Africa.

== Taxonomy ==
Tagulis granulosus was first described by Eugène Simon in 1895 from Sierra Leone. The species remained poorly studied until 2019, when it was redescribed based on examination of the female lectotype housed at the Muséum national d'histoire naturelle in Paris.

The genus Tagulis currently contains only two species: T. granulosus from Africa and T. mystacinus Simon, 1895 from Sri Lanka. Despite being geographically separated, the two species show similar morphological features, particularly in their female genitalia, suggesting they are closely related.

== Distribution ==
Tagulis granulosus has been recorded from several African countries. Originally described from Sierra Leone, it has since been found in Cameroon and Angola. In South Africa, the species was first recorded in 2020 from KwaZulu-Natal province, specifically in Tembe Elephant Park, iSimangaliso Wetland Park (Mkuzi Game Reserve), and Ndumo Game Reserve.

== Habitat ==
Specimens have been collected by beating shrubs and flowering plants at heights up to 3 meters. In South Africa, the species has been found in the Savanna biome at elevations between 42–91 metres above sea level.

== Description ==
Tagulis granulosus females have a total length of approximately 4.5 mm. The cephalothorax is round and reddish-brown, resembling leather in texture and appearance. In dorsal view, it displays a distinctive kite-shaped marking outlined by pale brown streaks, with the anterior border defined by the lateral eyes. The carapace sides are slightly granulated, and the chelicerae are orange-brown with prominent setae.

The eyes are arranged in two recurved rows, with the anterior lateral eyes being the largest, followed by the posterior lateral eyes, anterior median eyes, and posterior median eyes. A diagnostic feature of the genus is the presence of peculiar leaf-shaped macrosetae located immediately behind the lateral eyes.

The opisthosoma is oval-shaped and yellow with distinctive wave-like white line markings. The legs are brown with white bands at the distal ends of the femora, patellae, and tibiae, following the leg formula 2143 (second leg longest, third leg shortest).

The female epigyne features a prominent atrial hood, with copulatory openings originating at the posterior end of the hood. The copulatory ducts meander anteriorly before turning back towards irregularly shaped spermathecae. T. granulosus can be distinguished from its sister species T. mystacinus by details of the female genitalia, specifically having a parabolic atrial hood and longer copulatory ducts with two distinct turns.

Males of this species remain unknown.

== Conservation ==
In South Africa, Tagulis granulosus is classified as Least Concern due to its wide geographical range across Africa, despite having a limited extent of occurrence in the country. The species occurs in several protected areas, and no specific conservation threats have been identified.
