= Panaretella immaculata =

Spotted panaretella huntsman spider

Scientific classification
- Kingdom: Animalia
- Phylum: Arthropoda
- Subphylum: Chelicerata
- Class: Arachnida
- Order: Araneae
- Infraorder: Araneomorphae
- Family: Sparassidae
- Genus: Panaretella
- Species: P. immaculata

Binomial name
- Panaretella immaculata Lawrence, 1952

Species of spider

Panaretella immaculata is a spider species in the family Sparassidae. It is endemic to South Africa and is commonly known as the spotted Panaretella huntsman spider.

== Distribution ==
Panaretella immaculata is found in KwaZulu-Natal and Limpopo provinces. The species is protected in five protected areas including Ndumo Game Reserve, Polokwane Nature Reserve, Tembe Elephant Park, uMkhuze Game Reserve, and Enseleni Game Reserve. It occurs at altitudes ranging from 47 to 1,310 m.

== Habitat and ecology ==
Panaretella immaculata is a free-living plant dweller sampled from the Savanna Biome.

== Conservation ==
Panaretella immaculata is listed as Least Concern by the South African National Biodiversity Institute due to its wide geographical range. The species is protected in Ndumo Game Reserve and Polokwane Nature Reserve.
