= Copuetta erecta =

Dwarf tree lycosiform sac spider

Conservation status
- Least Concern (SANBI Red List)

Scientific classification
- Kingdom: Animalia
- Phylum: Arthropoda
- Subphylum: Chelicerata
- Class: Arachnida
- Order: Araneae
- Infraorder: Araneomorphae
- Family: Corinnidae
- Genus: Copuetta
- Species: C. erecta

Binomial name
- Copuetta erecta Haddad, 2013

Species of spider

Copuetta erecta is a species of spider in the family Corinnidae. It occurs in Mozambique and South Africa and is commonly known as the dwarf tree lycosiform sac spider.

== Distribution ==
Copuetta erecta is found in Mozambique and South Africa. In South Africa, it has been recorded only from KwaZulu-Natal at altitudes ranging from 18 to 1,427 m above sea level.

The species occurs in several protected areas including iSimangaliso Wetland Park, Ndumo Game Reserve, and Tembe Elephant Park.

== Habitat and ecology ==
Copuetta erecta is a free-living spider found from ground level to the tree canopy. It has been collected by sifting leaf litter, beating vegetation, and canopy fogging in closed-canopied coastal dune forests, riverine forests, and savanna habitats. The species inhabits the Indian Ocean Coastal Belt and Savanna biomes.

== Description ==
Copuetta erecta is known from both sexes. As a member of genus Copuetta, it is a medium-sized spider with a smooth carapace featuring black feathery setae forming distinct markings.

== Conservation ==
Copuetta erecta is listed as Least Concern by the South African National Biodiversity Institute due to its wide geographical range. The species faces no significant threats and is recorded from several protected areas.

== Taxonomy ==
The species was described by Charles R. Haddad in 2013 from Tembe Elephant Park, South Africa.
