= Copuetta lotzi =

Lotz's tree lycosiform sac spider

Conservation status
- Least Concern (SANBI Red List)

Scientific classification
- Kingdom: Animalia
- Phylum: Arthropoda
- Subphylum: Chelicerata
- Class: Arachnida
- Order: Araneae
- Infraorder: Araneomorphae
- Family: Corinnidae
- Genus: Copuetta
- Species: C. lotzi

Binomial name
- Copuetta lotzi Haddad, 2013

Species of spider

Copuetta lotzi is a species of spider in the family Corinnidae. It is endemic to South Africa and is commonly known as Lotz's tree lycosiform sac spider.

== Etymology ==
The species is named after South African arachnologist Leon N. Lotz.

== Distribution ==
Copuetta lotzi is endemic to South Africa and has been recorded from four provinces: Free State, Gauteng, Mpumalanga, and Western Cape. The species occurs at altitudes ranging from 613 to 1,601 m above sea level.

The species is protected in four protected areas including Benfontein Game Reserve, Free State National Botanical Gardens, Erfenis Dam Nature Reserve, and Anysberg Nature Reserve.

== Habitat and ecology ==
Copuetta lotzi is a ground-dwelling spider occurring in the more arid Grassland and Nama Karoo biomes of South Africa. It has been collected using pitfall traps and found under bark and rocks, as well as inside abandoned Trinervitermes trinervoides termite mounds. The species is occasionally found in houses, but not as frequently as C. lacustris.

== Description ==
Copuetta lotzi is known from both sexes. Like other members of its genus, it is a medium to large spider with a smooth carapace featuring black feathery setae forming different markings.

== Conservation ==
Copuetta lotzi is listed as Least Concern by the South African National Biodiversity Institute due to its wide geographical range. The species faces no significant threats and is recorded from several protected areas.

== Taxonomy ==
The species was described by Charles R. Haddad in 2013 from Bloemfontein in the Free State.
