= Panaretella scutata =

Brakkloof panaretella huntsman spider

Scientific classification
- Kingdom: Animalia
- Phylum: Arthropoda
- Subphylum: Chelicerata
- Class: Arachnida
- Order: Araneae
- Infraorder: Araneomorphae
- Family: Sparassidae
- Genus: Panaretella
- Species: P. scutata

Binomial name
- Panaretella scutata (Pocock, 1902)

Synonyms
- Palystes scutatus Pocock, 1902

Species of spider

Panaretella scutata is a spider species in the family Sparassidae. It is endemic to South Africa and is commonly known as the Brakkloof panaretella huntsman spider.

== Distribution ==
Panaretella scutata is found in the Eastern Cape and KwaZulu-Natal provinces. The species has been sampled from Grahamstown and Ndumo Game Reserve. It occurs at altitudes ranging from 47 to 565 m.

== Habitat and ecology ==
Panaretella scutata is a free-living plant dweller sampled from the Savanna and Thicket biomes.

== Conservation ==
Panaretella scutata is listed as Data Deficient by the South African National Biodiversity Institute. The status of the species remains obscure. Some more sampling is needed to collect the male and to determine the species' range. The species is protected in Ndumo Game Reserve.

== Taxonomy ==
Panaretella scutata was originally described by Pocock in 1902 as Palystes scutatus from Grahamstown in the Eastern Cape. The genus has not been revised, and only the female is known.
