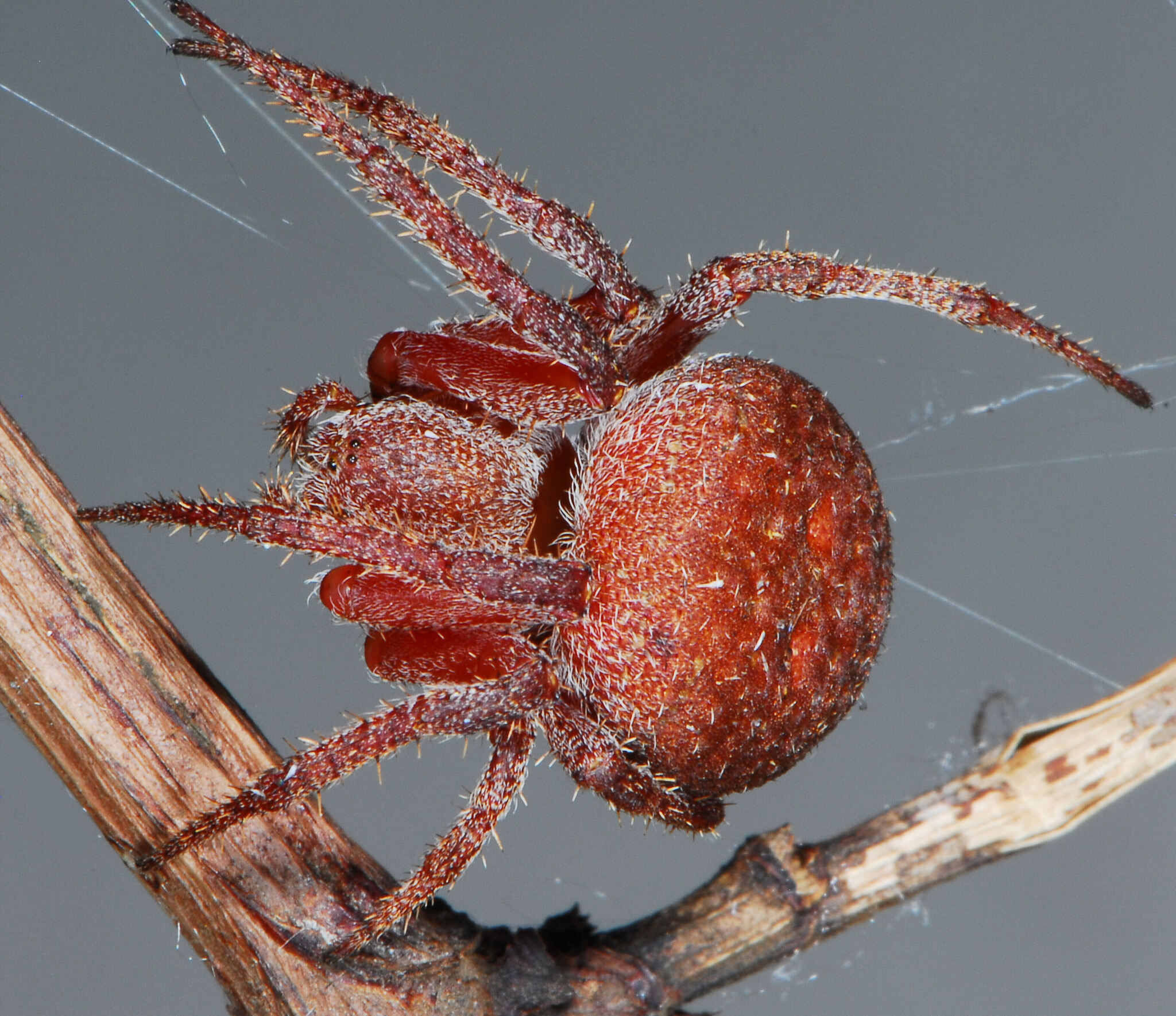
- Female
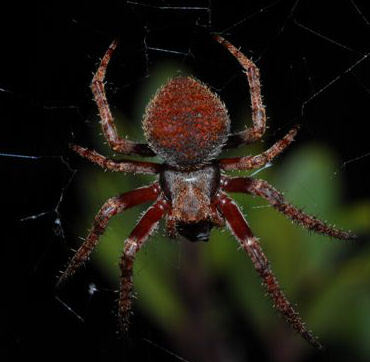
- Female

Scientific classification
- Kingdom: Animalia
- Phylum: Arthropoda
- Subphylum: Chelicerata
- Class: Arachnida
- Order: Araneae
- Infraorder: Araneomorphae
- Family: Araneidae
- Genus: Neoscona
- Species: N. penicillipes

Binomial name
- Neoscona penicillipes (Karsch, 1879)

Synonyms
- Araneus pachanus Pocock, 1898; Aranea bioculata Thorell, 1899; Aranea varians Thorell, 1899; Araneus haematocnemis Pocock, 1900; Aranea leimenstolli Strand, 1906

= Neoscona penicillipes =

Large Neoscona Orb-Web Spider

Species of spider

Neoscona penicillipes is a species of spider in the family Araneidae. It is commonly known as the large Neoscona orb-web spider.

== Etymology ==
The species name penicillipes means "brush-footed" in Latin.

== Distribution ==
Neoscona penicillipes is widespread throughout West and Central Africa, with the species also occurring in South Africa.

In South Africa, it has been sampled from eight provinces at altitudes ranging from 16 to 1,651 m above sea level. These include Eastern Cape, Free State, Gauteng, KwaZulu-Natal, Limpopo, Mpumalanga, North West, and Northern Cape.

== Habitat and ecology ==
Large orb-web spiders (11-22 mm) that make orb-webs at night in vegetation. The species has been sampled from the Grassland, Nama Karoo, Savanna, Succulent, and Thicket biomes. The species is also associated with the bark of Vachellia xanthophloea trees in Ndumo Game Reserve.

== Description ==
Neoscona penicillipes is known from both sexes. These are large orb-web spiders measuring 11-22 mm.

== Conservation ==
Neoscona penicillipes is listed as Least Concern by the South African National Biodiversity Institute due to its wide geographical range. There are no known threats to the species. The species is protected in more than 8 protected areas including Addo Elephant National Park, Ndumo Game Reserve, Tembe Elephant Park, Polokwane Nature Reserve, and Mpetsane Conservation Estate.

== Taxonomy ==
The species was described by Karsch in 1879 as Epeira penicillipes. It was revised by Grasshoff in 1986, who synonymized several species including Araneus bioculatus, A. haematocnemis, A. leimenstolli, A. pachanus, and A. varians.
