= Panaretella zuluana =

Hluhluwe panaretella huntsman spider

Scientific classification
- Kingdom: Animalia
- Phylum: Arthropoda
- Subphylum: Chelicerata
- Class: Arachnida
- Order: Araneae
- Infraorder: Araneomorphae
- Family: Sparassidae
- Genus: Panaretella
- Species: P. zuluana

Binomial name
- Panaretella zuluana Lawrence, 1937

Synonyms
- Paranetella zuluana Lawrence, 1937

Species of spider

Panaretella zuluana is a spider species in the family Sparassidae. It is endemic to South Africa and is commonly known as the Hluhluwe panaretella huntsman spider.

== Distribution ==
Panaretella zuluana is found in KwaZulu-Natal and Mpumalanga provinces. The species has been sampled from Hluhluwe Nature Reserve, iSimangaliso Wetland Park, Ndumo Game Reserve, Nkandla Forest, and Kruger National Park. It occurs at altitudes ranging from 20 to 1,102 m.

== Habitat and ecology ==
Panaretella zuluana is a free-living plant dweller sampled from the Indian Ocean Coastal Belt and Savanna biomes.

== Conservation ==
Panaretella zuluana is listed as Least Concern by the South African National Biodiversity Institute due to its wide geographic range. The species is protected in Ndumo Game Reserve, Hluhluwe Nature Reserve, and Kruger National Park.
