= Copuetta maputa =

Maputaland tree lycosiform sac spider

Conservation status
- Least Concern (SANBI Red List)

Scientific classification
- Kingdom: Animalia
- Phylum: Arthropoda
- Subphylum: Chelicerata
- Class: Arachnida
- Order: Araneae
- Infraorder: Araneomorphae
- Family: Corinnidae
- Genus: Copuetta
- Species: C. maputa

Binomial name
- Copuetta maputa Haddad, 2013

Species of spider

Copuetta maputa is a species of spider in the family Corinnidae. It occurs in Mozambique and South Africa and is commonly known as the Maputaland tree lycosiform sac spider.

== Etymology ==
The species is named after Maputaland, the coastal plain region where it occurs.

== Distribution ==
Copuetta maputa is found in Mozambique and South Africa. In South Africa, it has been recorded from several areas in KwaZulu-Natal at elevations lower than 100 m above sea level. Throughout its range, it has only been collected along the Maputaland coastal plain at altitudes ranging from 6 to 96 m above sea level.

The species is conserved in two protected areas, iSimangaliso Wetland Park and Ndumo Game Reserve.

== Habitat and ecology ==
Copuetta maputa has been collected in various strata of forest and woodland habitats, including shrubs, tree bark, tree canopies, and leaf litter. The species inhabits the Indian Ocean Coastal Belt and Savanna biomes and has also been collected from the walls of houses.

== Description ==
Copuetta maputa is known from both sexes. Like other members of its genus, it is a medium to large spider with a smooth carapace featuring black feathery setae forming different markings.

== Conservation ==
Copuetta maputa is listed as Least Concern by the South African National Biodiversity Institute due to its wide geographical range. The species faces no significant threats and has been recorded from several protected areas.

== Taxonomy ==
The species was described by Charles R. Haddad in 2013 from Ndumo Game Reserve, South Africa. It is the type species of the genus Copuetta.
