= Copuetta magna =

Giant tree lycosiform sac spider

Conservation status
- Least Concern (SANBI Red List)

Scientific classification
- Kingdom: Animalia
- Phylum: Arthropoda
- Subphylum: Chelicerata
- Class: Arachnida
- Order: Araneae
- Infraorder: Araneomorphae
- Family: Corinnidae
- Genus: Copuetta
- Species: C. magna

Binomial name
- Copuetta magna Haddad, 2013

Species of spider

Copuetta magna is a species of spider in the family Corinnidae. It occurs in Mozambique, Tanzania, and South Africa and is commonly known as the giant tree lycosiform sac spider.

== Distribution ==
Copuetta magna is found in Mozambique, Tanzania, and South Africa. In South Africa, it has been recorded from three provinces: KwaZulu-Natal, Mpumalanga, and Limpopo at altitudes ranging from 4 to 1,303 m above sea level.

The species occurs in several protected areas including iSimangaliso Wetland Park, Ndumo Game Reserve, Ophathe Game Reserve, and Kruger National Park.

== Habitat and ecology ==
Copuetta magna is a free-living spider collected from tsetse fly traps, walls of houses, tree bark, and tree canopies. The species inhabits the Indian Ocean Coastal Belt and Savanna biomes.

== Description ==
Copuetta magna is known from both sexes. As its common name suggests, it is among the larger members of its genus. Like other members of its genus, it has a smooth carapace featuring black feathery setae forming markings.

== Conservation ==
Copuetta magna is listed as Least Concern by the South African National Biodiversity Institute due to its wide geographical range. The species faces no significant threats and is recorded from several protected areas.

== Taxonomy ==
The species was described by species:Charles R. Haddad in 2013 from Ndumo Game Reserve, South Africa.
