= Thomas Pooley (disambiguation) =

Thomas Pooley (c. 1788 – 1846 or later) was an English property developer.

Thomas Pooley may also refer to:

- Thomas Pooley well-sinker (1806–1876), a Cornish labourer convicted of blasphemy in 1857.
- Thomas Pooley (c. 1844–1723), the elder brother of Bishop John Pooley, was an English-born Dublin-based portrait painter who sat in the Irish House of Commons for the constituency of Newcastle from 1695 to 1699.
