= Panaretella minor =

Pietermaritzburg panaretella huntsman spider

Scientific classification
- Kingdom: Animalia
- Phylum: Arthropoda
- Subphylum: Chelicerata
- Class: Arachnida
- Order: Araneae
- Infraorder: Araneomorphae
- Family: Sparassidae
- Genus: Panaretella
- Species: P. minor

Binomial name
- Panaretella minor Lawrence, 1952

Species of spider

Panaretella minor is a spider species in the family Sparassidae. It is endemic to South Africa and is commonly known as the Pietermaritzburg Panaretella huntsman spider.

== Distribution ==
Panaretella minor is found in the Eastern Cape and KwaZulu-Natal provinces. The species has been sampled from East London, Ingele Forest, Pietermaritzburg, Richmond, and Ndumo Game Reserve. It occurs at altitudes ranging from 47 to 1,349 m.

== Habitat and ecology ==
Panaretella minor is a free-living plant dweller sampled from the Forest, Grassland, and Savanna biomes.

== Conservation ==
Panaretella minor is listed as Least Concern by the South African National Biodiversity Institute. Much natural habitat remains within this species' range, and it is suspected to be under-sampled and to be extant in more than 15 locations. The species is protected in Ndumo Game Reserve.
