= Zelotes ngomensis =

Ngome Dark Ground Spider

Conservation status
- Least Concern (SANBI Red List)

Scientific classification
- Kingdom: Animalia
- Phylum: Arthropoda
- Subphylum: Chelicerata
- Class: Arachnida
- Order: Araneae
- Infraorder: Araneomorphae
- Family: Gnaphosidae
- Genus: Zelotes
- Species: Z. ngomensis

Binomial name
- Zelotes ngomensis FitzPatrick, 2007

Species of spider

Zelotes ngomensis is a species of spider in the family Gnaphosidae. It is endemic to KwaZulu-Natal and is commonly known as the ngome dark ground spider.

== Distribution ==
Zelotes ngomensis is endemic to KwaZulu-Natal, South Africa. The species occurs at altitudes ranging from 140 to 1,129 m above sea level.

Collection localities include Ithala Nature Reserve, Ngome State Forest, and Ndumo Game Reserve.

== Habitat and ecology ==
Zelotes ngomensis are free-running ground spiders found under stones during the day. The species has been sampled from the Savanna biome.

== Conservation ==
Zelotes ngomensis is listed as Least Concern by the South African National Biodiversity Institute. This species is highly likely to be under collected. With no threats currently known to affect the species, it is listed as Least Concern. The species is fairly abundant in the Ngome State Forest and is also protected in the Ithala Nature Reserve and Ndumo Game Reserve.

== Taxonomy ==
The species was described by FitzPatrick in 2007 from Ngome State Forest. The species is known from both sexes.
