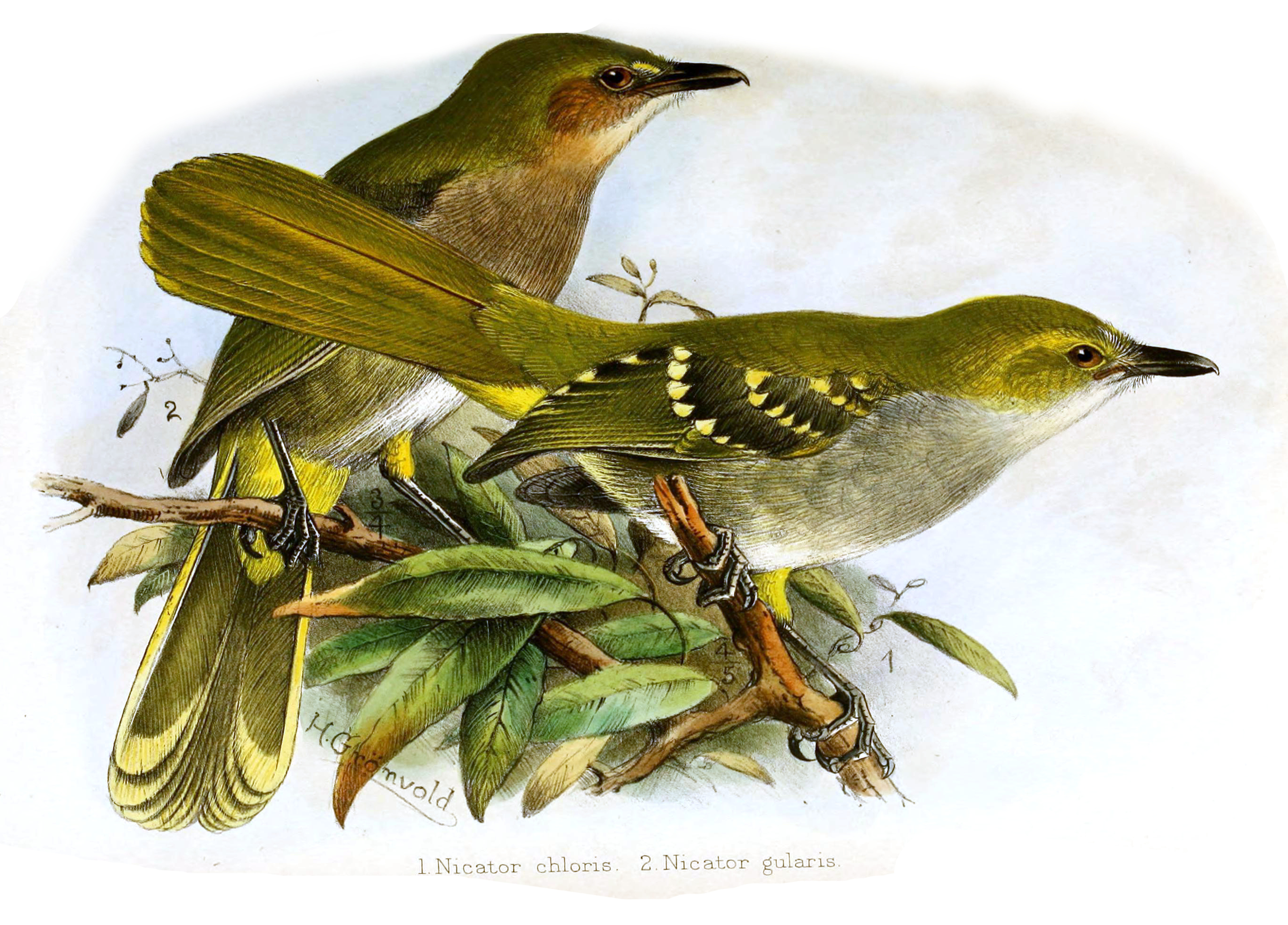
- N. gularis (left) and N. chloris (right)

Scientific classification
- Kingdom: Animalia
- Phylum: Chordata
- Class: Aves
- Order: Passeriformes
- Parvorder: Sylviida
- Family: Nicatoridae
- Genus: Nicator; Hartlaub & Finsch, 1870

Type species
- Lanius chloris Valenciennes, 1826
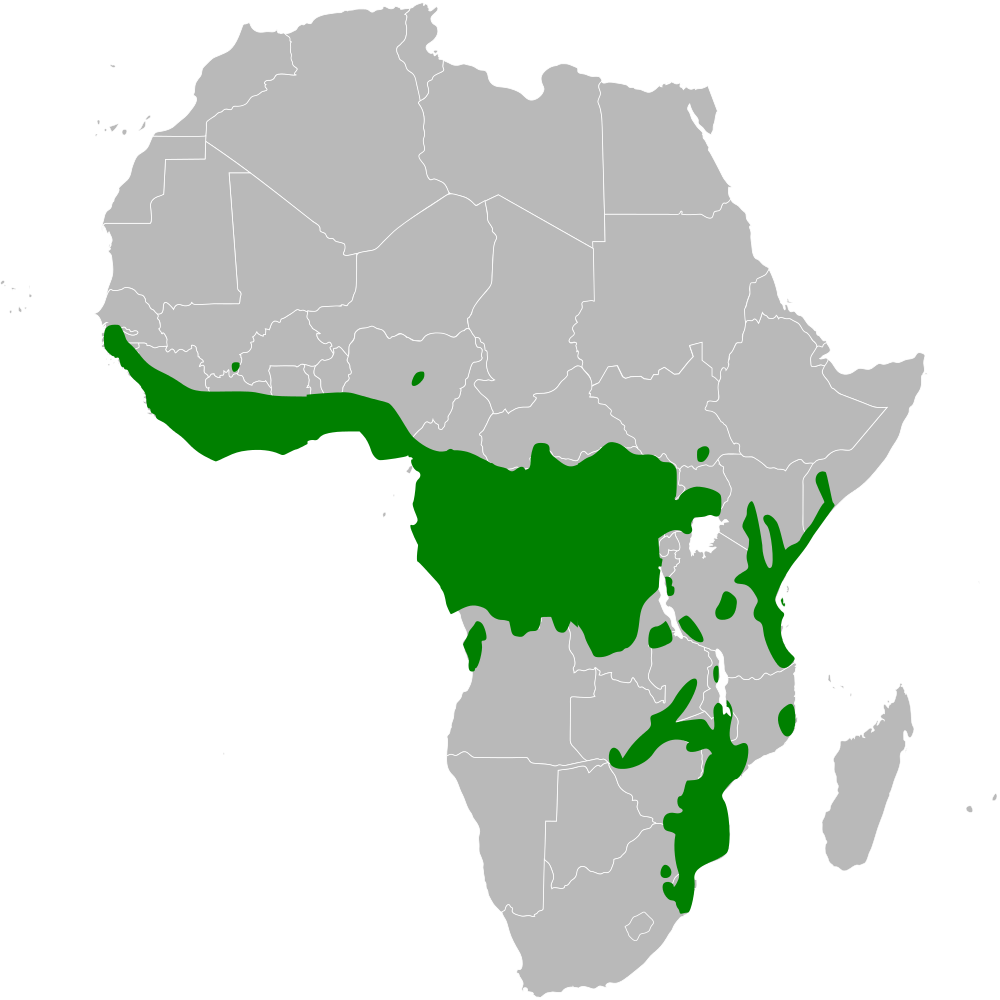
- Range of the genus

= Nicator =

Genus of birds

The nicators are a genus, Nicator, and family, Nicatoridae, of songbirds endemic to Africa. The genus and family contain three species.

== Taxonomy ==
The systematic affinities of the genus have been a long-standing mystery. The group was originally assigned to the shrikes (Laniidae). In the 1920s James Chapin noted the similarities between the nicators and both the bulbuls (Pycnonotidae) and the bushshrikes (Malaconotidae). It wasn't until 1943 that Jean Théodore Delacour placed the genus with the bulbuls. Storrs Olson argued that the genus was more closely related to the bushshrikes, as the nicators lacked the ossification of the nostril found in all other bulbuls. A number of features, including the position of the facial bristles (which are preorbital rather than rictal), their nests and the calls, make the genus unique, and DNA studies have recently suggested that the genus is best treated as a monogeneric family. Some authorities, like the Clements Checklist, treat the nicators as a new family, Nicatoridae.

The name of the genus is derived from Nikátōr (Νικάτωρ), Greek for 'conqueror'. Within the genus, the western and eastern nicators are considered to form a superspecies and are sometimes treated as the same species.

=== Species ===
Image	Scientific name	Common name	Distribution
	Nicator chloris	Western nicator	Angola, Benin, Cameroon, Central African Republic, Republic of the Congo, Democratic Republic of the Congo, Ivory Coast, Equatorial Guinea, Gabon, Gambia, Ghana, Guinea, Guinea-Bissau, Liberia, Mali, Nigeria, Senegal, Sierra Leone, South Sudan, Tanzania, Togo, and Uganda.
	Nicator gularis	Eastern nicator	Kenya, Malawi, Mozambique, Somalia, South Africa, Swaziland, Tanzania, Zambia, and Zimbabwe.
	Nicator vireo	Yellow-throated nicator	Angola, Cameroon, Central African Republic, Republic of the Congo, DRC, Equatorial Guinea, Gabon, and Uganda.

== Description ==
The nicators are shrike-like birds, 16 to 23 cm (6.3–9.1 in) in length. The eastern and western nicators are similar in size and larger than the yellow-throated nicator. The males are considerably heavier than the females, for example in the western nicator the males range from 48 to 67 g (1.7–2.4 oz), whereas the females only weigh 32 to 51 g (1.1–1.8 oz). The yellow-throated nicator is much lighter, ranging from only 21 to 26 g (0.74–0.92 oz). The nicators have heavy hooked bills. The plumage of the genus is overall olive on the backs, tail and wings, with yellow spotting on the wings, and lighter grey or whitish undersides.

== Distribution and habitat ==
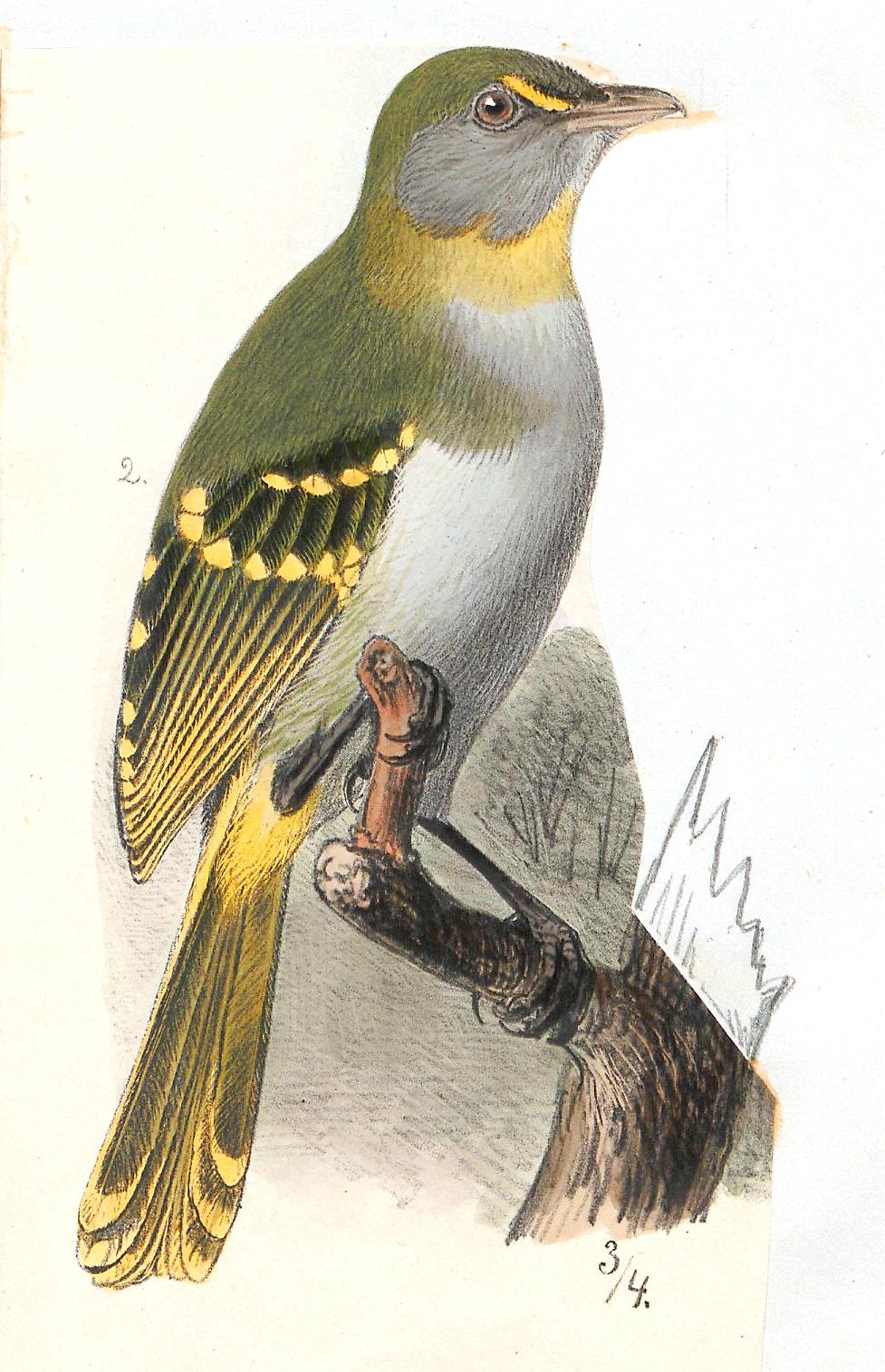
Yellow-throated nicator of the tropical lowlands

The nicators are endemic to Sub-Saharan Africa. The western nicator has a mostly continuous distribution from Senegal to eastern Uganda and northern Angola. The eastern nicator has a discontinuous distribution in East Africa from Somalia south to eastern South Africa. The yellow-throated nicator is distributed in central Africa from Cameroon to Uganda.

The nicators occupy a wide range of forest and woodland habitats.
