= Elsa Pooley =

South African botanist

Elsa Pooley (born Elsa Susanna Bond; 1947 in Johannesburg), is a South African botanist, landscaper, tour guide, and artist.

== Biography ==
She lived in and explored the game reserves Ndumu and Mkuzi for about 20 years, where she became inspired by the flora of the region. She collected plants, painted them, wrote about them, and gardened with them. Her work has been exhibited throughout South Africa which has led to commissions, both local and abroad. Her paintings have appeared in the series Flowering Plants of Africa and her limited edition portfolio 'Palms of Africa' (1988) has been sold worldwide. She was commissioned to do paintings for the Blue Train in 1999.

Pooley has lived at Clansthal on the KwaZulu-Natal South Coast since 1984, and spends her time painting, writing and conducting painting tours of KwaZulu-Natal and Lesotho. She is a founder member of BAASA, the Botanical Artists' Association of Southern Africa.

Elsa Pooley was married to Tony Pooley (1938-2004), a game ranger and renowned authority on crocodiles. She had three sons from the marriage - Simon, Justin and Thomas.

== Books ==
- Flowers, Grasses, Ferns & Fungi. Southern Book Publishers. 1999. ISBN 978-1-86812-748-1. with Vincent Carruthers
- Mashesha - The Making of a Game Ranger. 1992 with Tony Pooley
- The Complete Field Guide to Trees of Natal, Zululand & Transkei. Natal Flora Publications Trust. 1993. ISBN 978-0-620-17612-5.
- Field Guide - Natuurlewe Van Suider-afrika. Struik. 2000. ISBN 978-1-86872-452-9. with Vincent Carruthers
- The Wildlife of Southern Africa: A Field Guide to the Animals and Plants of the Region. Struik. 2005. ISBN 978-1-86872-451-2. with Vincent Carruthers
- A Field Guide to Wild Flowers: KwaZulu-Natal and the Eastern Region. Natal Flora Publications Trust. 1998. ISBN 978-0-620-21500-8.
- Sasol Trees of Southern Africa: A First Field Guide. Struik Publishers. 1999. ISBN 978-1-86872-291-4.
- Mountain Flowers: A Field Guide to the Flora of the Drakensberg and Lesotho. Natal Flora Publications Trust. 2003. ISBN 978-0-620-30221-0.
- Forest Plants: In the Forest and in the Garden. Flora Publications Trust. 2006. ISBN 978-0-620-37012-7. with Geoff Nichols

== Papers ==
- Pooley, A.C.; Pooley, E.S.; Hadley, Wayne F.; Gans, Carl (1973). "Ecological aspects of the subsoil herpetofauna in Ndumu Game Reserve". Annals of Carnegie Museum. 44 Article 8.
- Anderson, J.L.; Pooley, E.S. (1977). "Some plants identified in the rumina of Nyala antelope Tragelaphus angasi in Ndumu Game Reserve". Lammergeyer. 23. Natal Parks Board: 40–45.
- De Moor, P.P.; Pooley, E.S.; Neville, G.; Barichievy, J. (1977). "Vegetation of Ndumu Game Reserve, Natal. A Quantitative Physiognomic Survey". Annals of the Natal Museum. 23 (1): 239–272.
- Pooley, E. S. (1978). "A checklist of the plants of Ndumu Game Reserve, North-eastern Zululand". J. S. Afr. Bot. 44 (1): 1–54. Archived from the original on 1 January 2018.
- Pooley, E.S. (1980) "A report on a study of Smilax kraussiana in the St Lucia Resort Game Park". Internal report, Natal Parks Board.
- Pooley, E.S. (1980). "Some notes on the utilization of natural resources by the tribal people of Maputaland". In Bruton, Michael N.; Cooper, Keith H. (eds.). Studies on the Ecology of Maputaland. Rhodes University. pp. 467–479. ISBN 978-0-86810-035-7.
- Pooley, E.S. (1989). "Palms of Southern Africa". Veld and Flora. Botanical Society of SA.
- Smedley, Linda N.; Ribeiro-Torres, J. L. (1979). Man and the Pongolo Floodplain; a Preliminary Study. The Council.

== Awards ==
- 1996 Conservationist of the Year from the Wildlife & Environment Society (Natal Branch)
- 1999 Certificate of Merit for Outstanding Contribution to Botany from the South African Association of Botanists
- 2000 Bronze Medal at the Inaugural Kirstenbosch Exhibition of Botanical Art
- 2004 Marloth Medal from the Botanical Society of Southern Africa
- 2008 Honorary Doctor of Science by the University of KwaZulu-Natal
