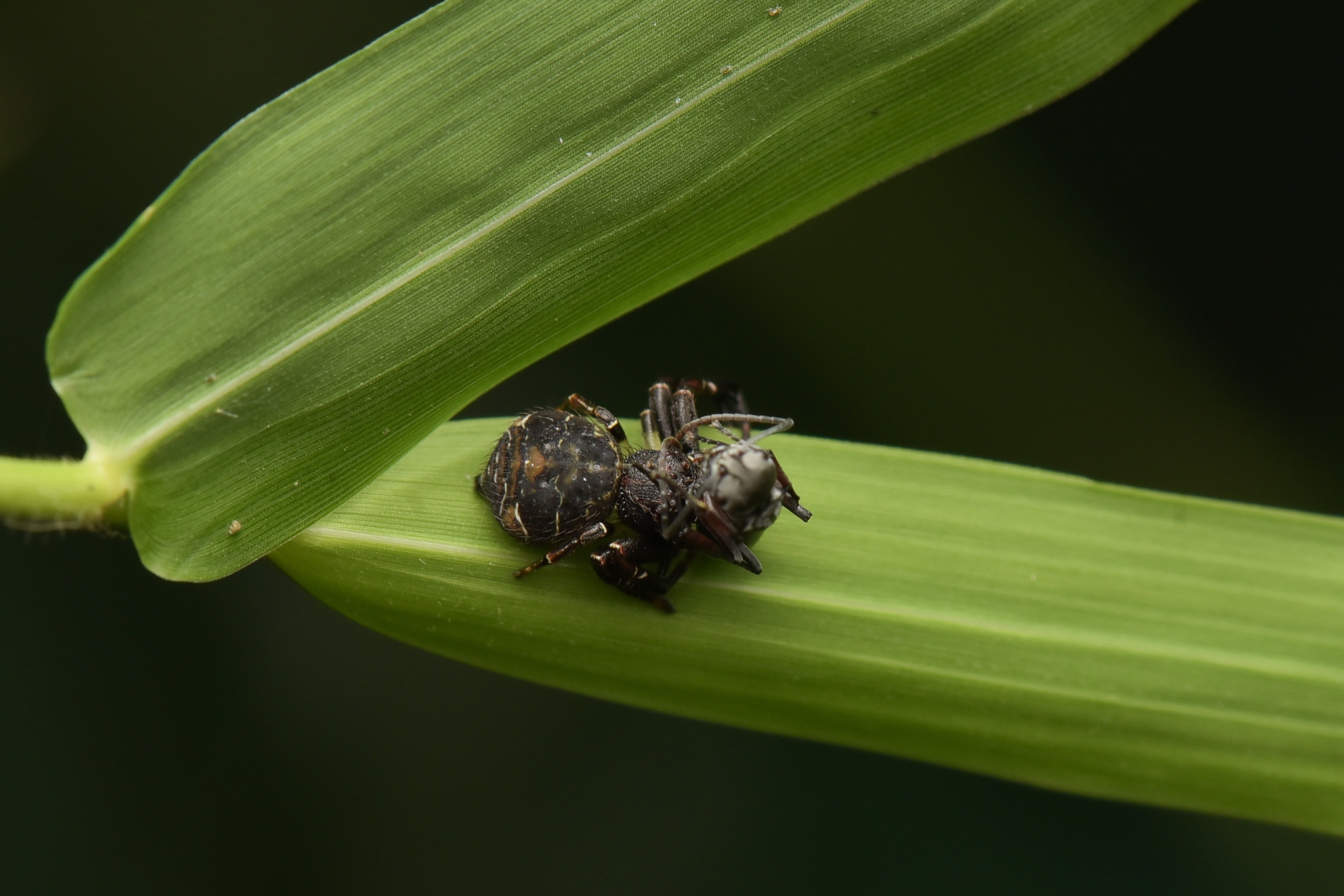
- T. mystacinus from India

Scientific classification
- Kingdom: Animalia
- Phylum: Arthropoda
- Subphylum: Chelicerata
- Class: Arachnida
- Order: Araneae
- Infraorder: Araneomorphae
- Family: Thomisidae
- Genus: Tagulis; Simon, 1895

Type species
- Tagulis granulosus Simon, 1895

Species
- See text

Diversity
- 2 species

= Tagulis =

Genus of spiders

Tagulis is a genus of crab spiders in the family Thomisidae, with two described species.

== Species ==
- Tagulis granulosus Simon, 1895 — Sierra Leone, Cameroon, Angola, South Africa
- Tagulis mystacinus Simon, 1895 — Sri Lanka
