= Panaretella distincta =

East London panaretella huntsman spider

Scientific classification
- Kingdom: Animalia
- Phylum: Arthropoda
- Subphylum: Chelicerata
- Class: Arachnida
- Order: Araneae
- Infraorder: Araneomorphae
- Family: Sparassidae
- Genus: Panaretella
- Species: P. distincta

Binomial name
- Panaretella distincta (Pocock, 1896)

Synonyms
- Panaretus distinctus Pocock, 1896; Paranetella distincta Lawrence, 1937

Species of spider

Panaretella distincta is a spider species in the family Sparassidae. It is endemic to South Africa and is commonly known as the East London panaretella huntsman spider.

== Distribution ==
Panaretella distincta is found in the Eastern Cape and KwaZulu-Natal provinces. The species has been sampled from East London, Port St. Johns, Kei River Mouth, Vernon Crookes Nature Reserve, Mkhuze Game Reserve, and Eshowe. It occurs at altitudes ranging from 52 to 485 m.

== Habitat and ecology ==
Panaretella distincta is a free-living plant dweller sampled from the Indian Ocean Coastal Belt, Savanna, and Thicket biomes.

== Conservation ==
Panaretella distincta is listed as Near Threatened by the South African National Biodiversity Institute. Although only known from one sex, the species range is well enough known for an assessment to be made. It occurs predominantly along the coast and is losing habitat to coastal housing development and crop cultivation. The species is likely to be under-collected and is suspected to occur between 10 and 15 extant locations.

== Taxonomy ==
Panaretella distincta was originally described by Pocock in 1896 as Panaretus distinctus from East London in the Eastern Cape. The genus has not been revised, and only the female is known.
