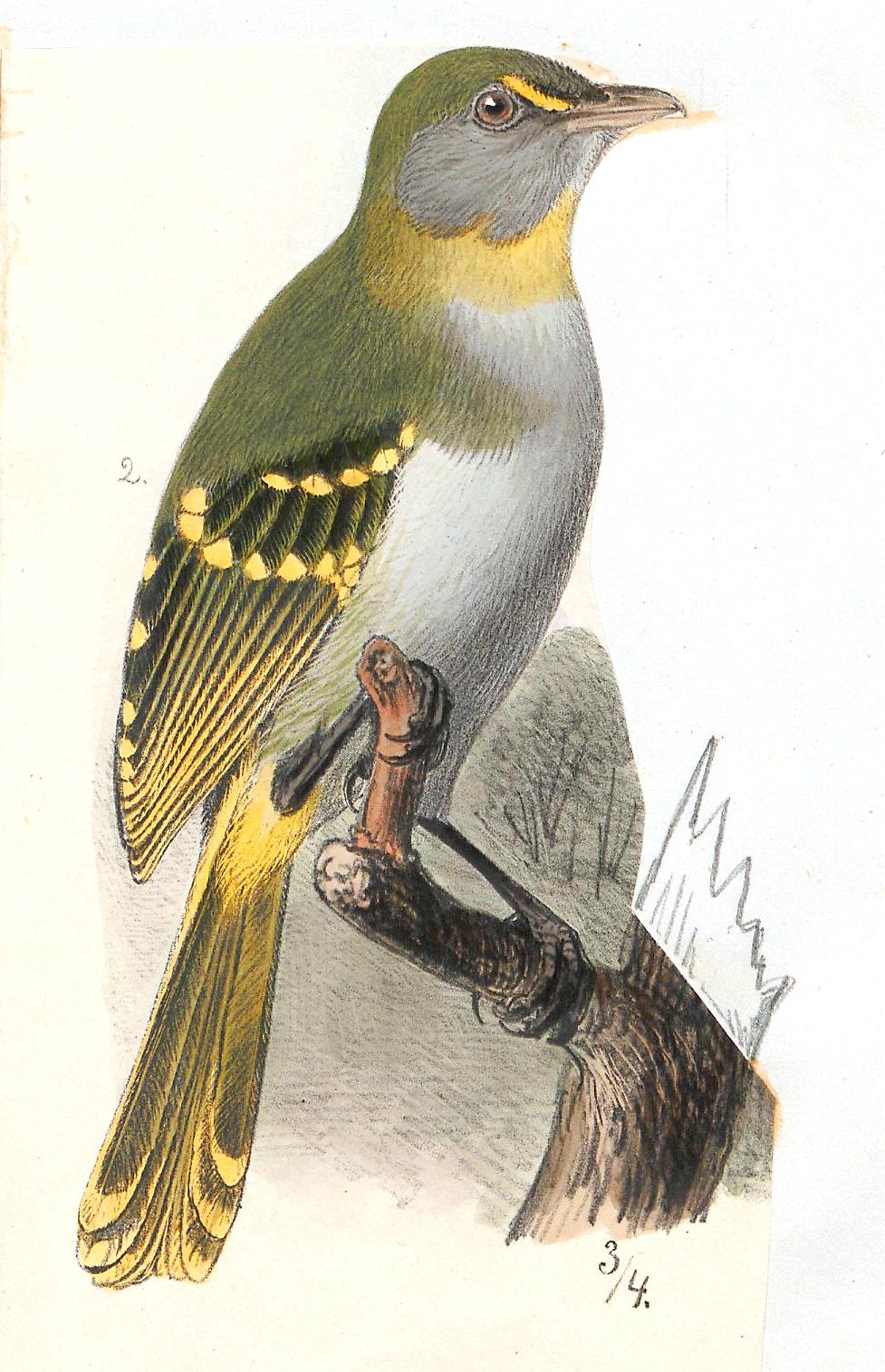

Conservation status
- Least Concern (IUCN 3.1)

Scientific classification
- Kingdom: Animalia
- Phylum: Chordata
- Class: Aves
- Order: Passeriformes
- Family: Nicatoridae
- Genus: Nicator
- Species: N. vireo

Binomial name
- Nicator vireo Cabanis, 1876
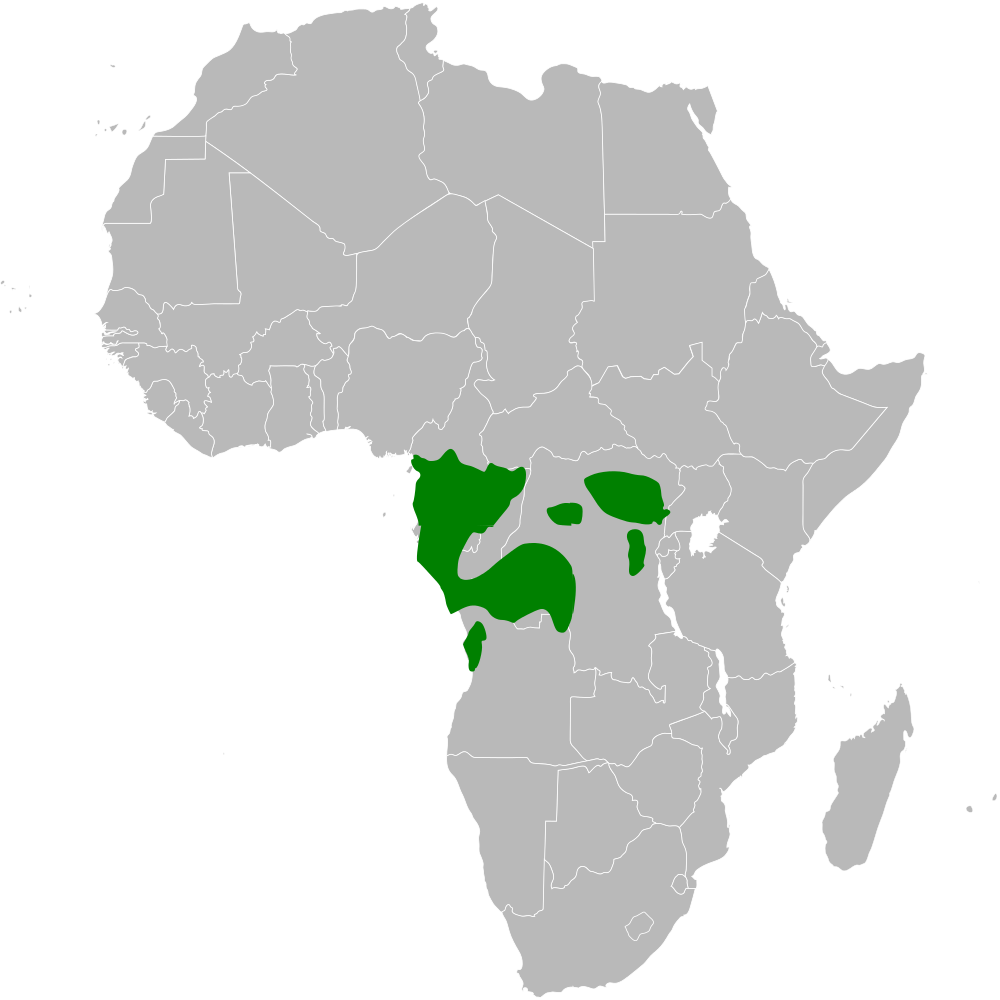

= Yellow-throated nicator =

Species of songbird

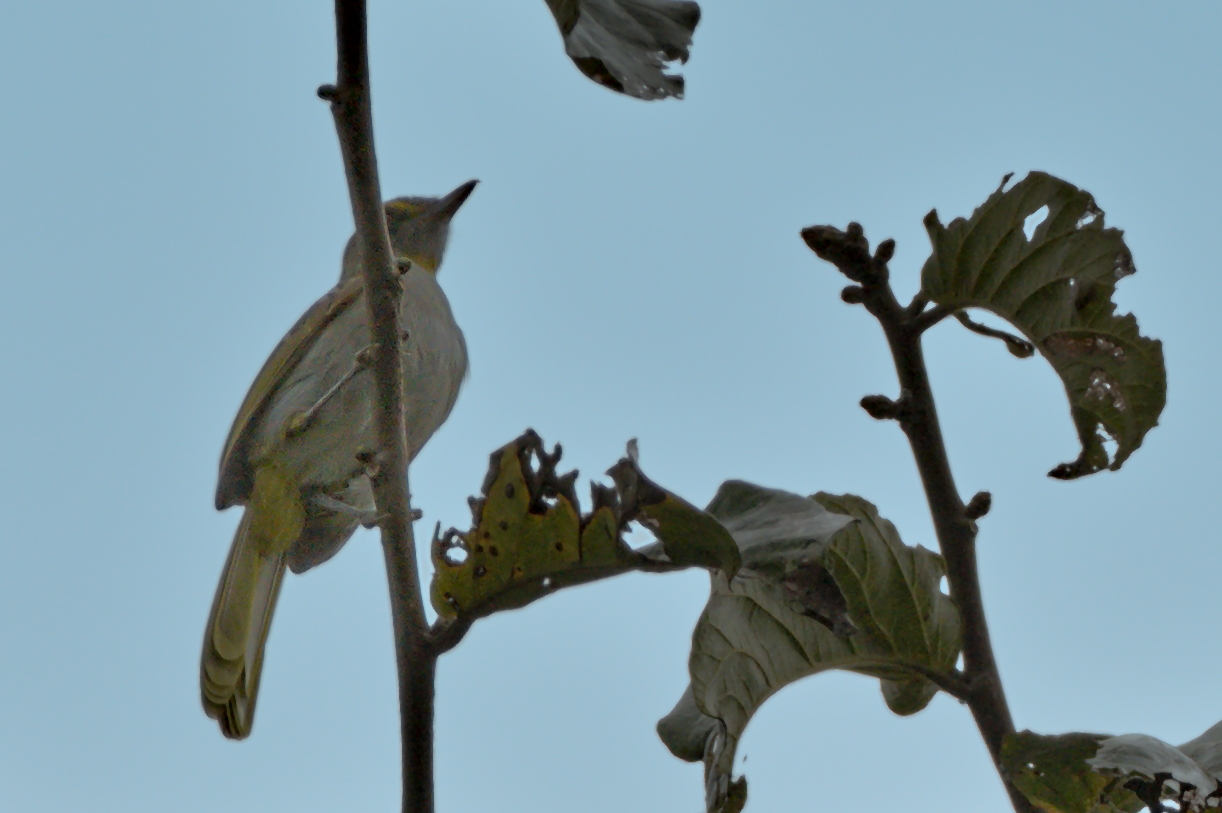
Yellow-throated Nicator

The yellow-throated nicator (Nicator vireo) is a species of songbird in the family Nicatoridae.

== Range and habitat ==
It is found in Angola, Cameroon, Central African Republic, Republic of the Congo, DRC, Equatorial Guinea, Gabon, and Uganda. Its natural habitat is subtropical or tropical moist lowland forests.
