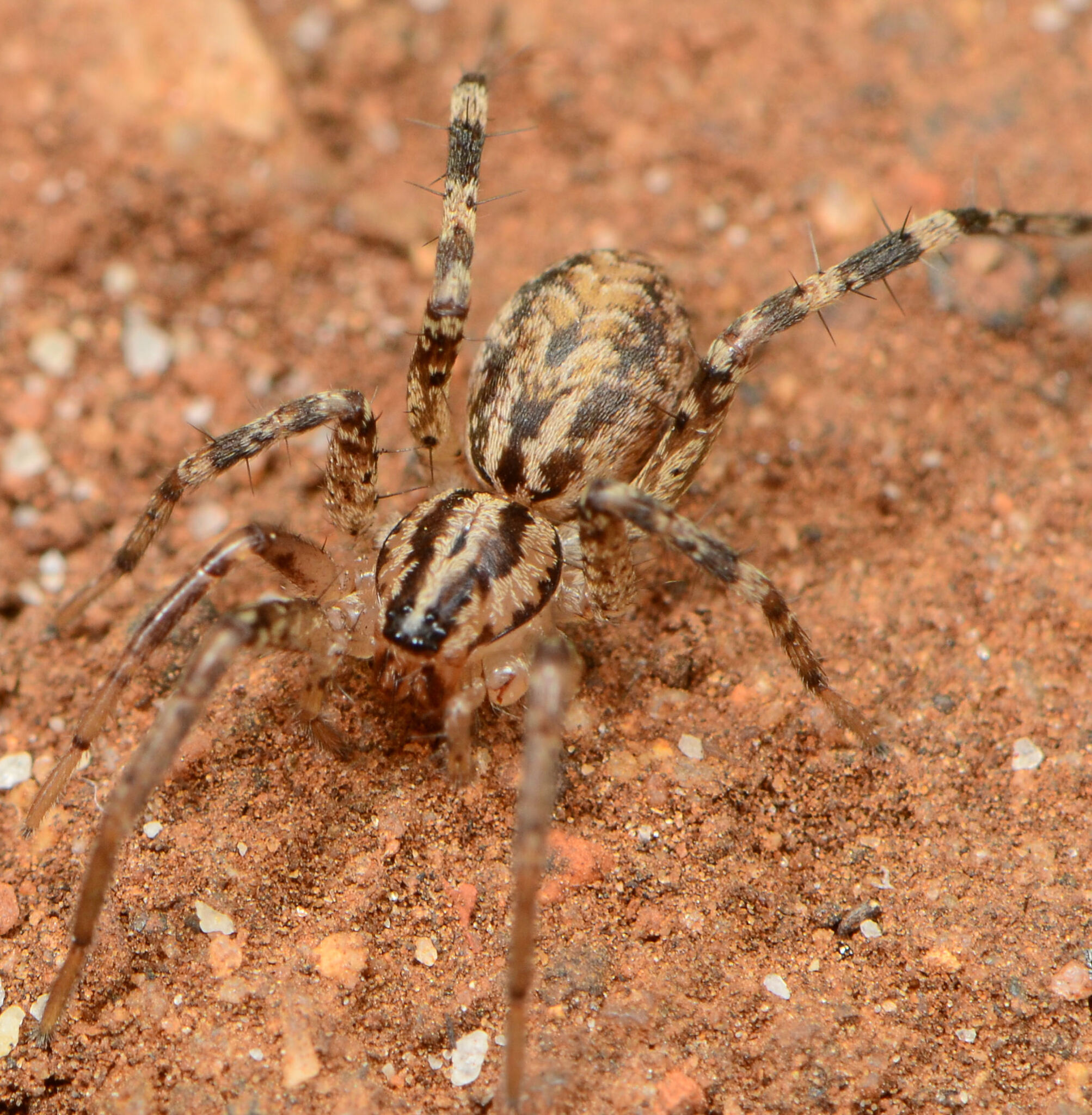
- Female C. lacustris
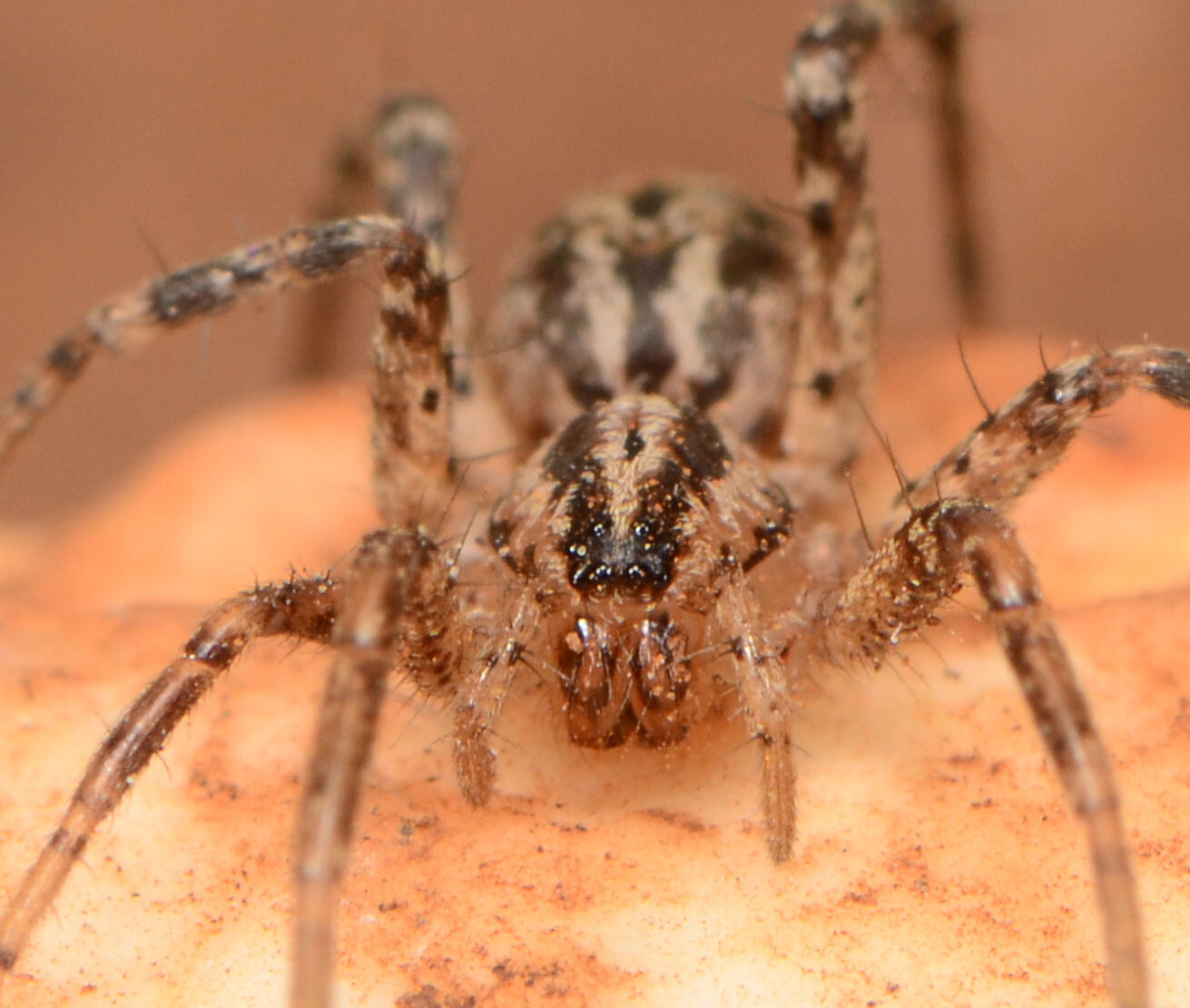
- Female C. lacustris

Scientific classification
- Kingdom: Animalia
- Phylum: Arthropoda
- Subphylum: Chelicerata
- Class: Arachnida
- Order: Araneae
- Infraorder: Araneomorphae
- Family: Corinnidae
- Genus: Copuetta; Haddad, 2013

Type species
- C. maputa Haddad, 2013

Species
- 13, see text

= Copuetta =

Genus of spiders

Copuetta is a genus of African corinnid sac spiders first described by C. R. Haddad in 2013.

== Species ==
As of October 2025, this genus includes thirteen species:

- Copuetta comorica Haddad, 2013 – Comoros
- Copuetta erecta Haddad, 2013 – Mozambique, South Africa
- Copuetta kakamega Haddad, 2013 – Kenya
- Copuetta kwamgumi Haddad, 2013 – Tanzania
- Copuetta lacustris (Strand, 1916) – Central, East, Southern Africa
- Copuetta lesnei Haddad, 2013 – Mozambique
- Copuetta litipo Haddad, 2013 – Tanzania
- Copuetta lotzi Haddad, 2013 – South Africa
- Copuetta magna Haddad, 2013 – Tanzania, Mozambique, South Africa
- Copuetta maputa Haddad, 2013 – Mozambique, South Africa (type species)
- Copuetta naja Haddad, 2013 – Tanzania
- Copuetta uzungwa Haddad, 2013 – Tanzania
- Copuetta wagneri Haddad, 2013 – Uganda
