= Panaretella =

Scientific classification
- Kingdom: Animalia
- Phylum: Arthropoda
- Subphylum: Chelicerata
- Class: Arachnida
- Order: Araneae
- Infraorder: Araneomorphae
- Family: Sparassidae
- Genus: Panaretella; Lawrence, 1937

Type species
- P. distincta (Pocock, 1896)

Species
- 5, see text

Genus of spiders

Panaretella is a genus of South African huntsman spiders that was first described by R. F. Lawrence in 1937.

== Description ==
Panaretella species are large spiders that resemble rain spiders. The carapace is slightly longer than wide. The anterior lateral eyes are only slightly larger than other eyes. The posterior eye row is wider than the anterior eye row. The sternum and coxae ventrally have fine black cuticular spots against a pale white to yellow-brown background. The abdomen posteriorly has a black marking on each side.

== Life style ==
Panaretella species are free-living plant dwellers found in vegetation like trees. They construct silk retreats between two leaves held together with silk strands.

== Taxonomy ==
The genus Panaretella was described by Lawrence in 1937 and occurs in the eastern coastal dune forests of South Africa. Five species are known from South Africa. The genus has not been revised.

== Species ==
As of September 2025, this genus includes five species endemic to South Africa:

- Panaretella distincta (Pocock, 1896) (type species)
- Panaretella immaculata Lawrence, 1952
- Panaretella minor Lawrence, 1952
- Panaretella scutata (Pocock, 1902)
- Panaretella zuluana Lawrence, 1937
