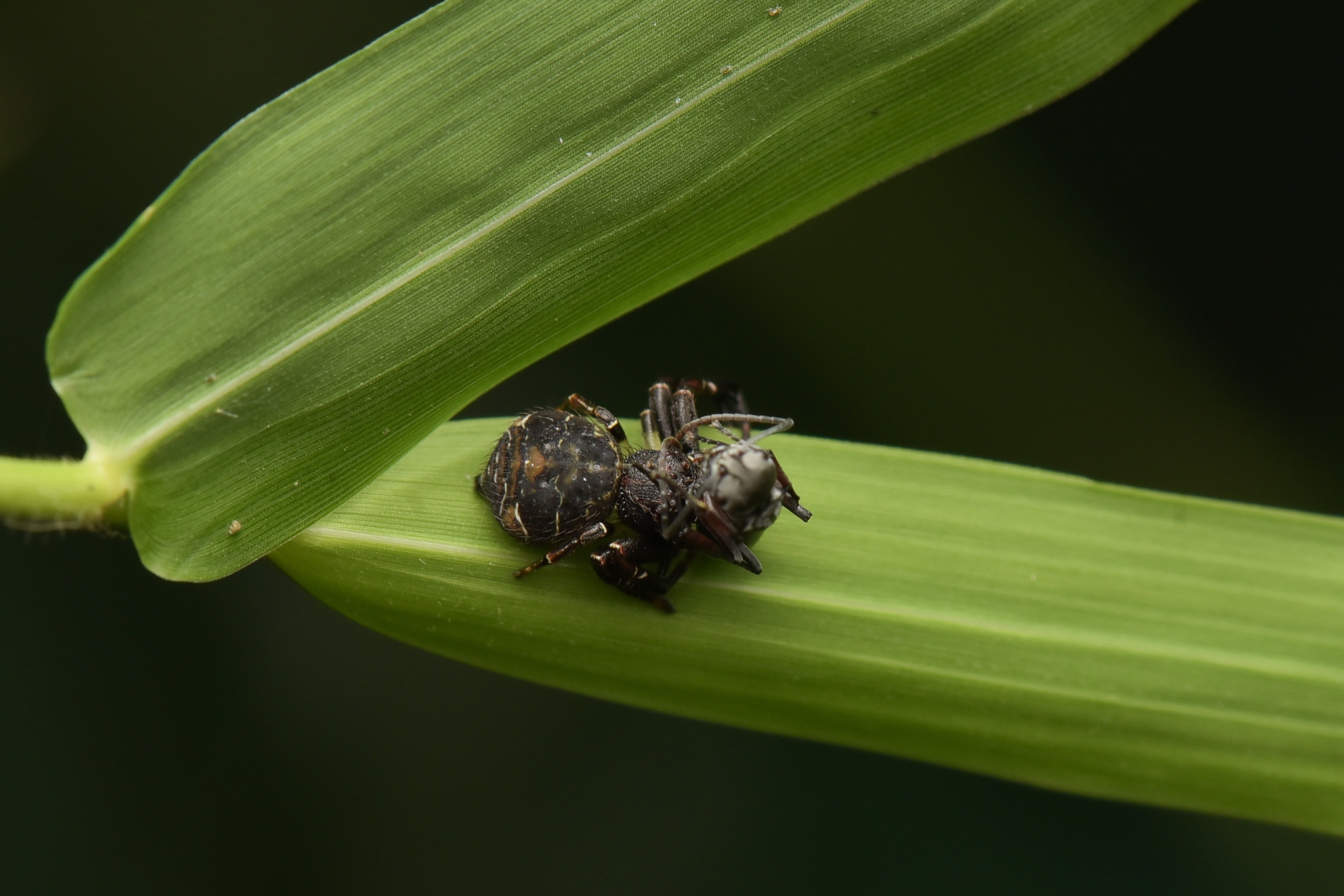
- T. mystacinus from India

Scientific classification
- Kingdom: Animalia
- Phylum: Arthropoda
- Subphylum: Chelicerata
- Class: Arachnida
- Order: Araneae
- Infraorder: Araneomorphae
- Family: Thomisidae
- Genus: Tagulis
- Species: T. mystacinus

Binomial name
- Tagulis mystacinus Simon, 1895

= Tagulis mystacinus =

Species of spider

Tagulis mystacinus, is a species of spider of the genus Tagulis. It is endemic to Sri Lanka.

== See also ==
- List of Thomisidae species
