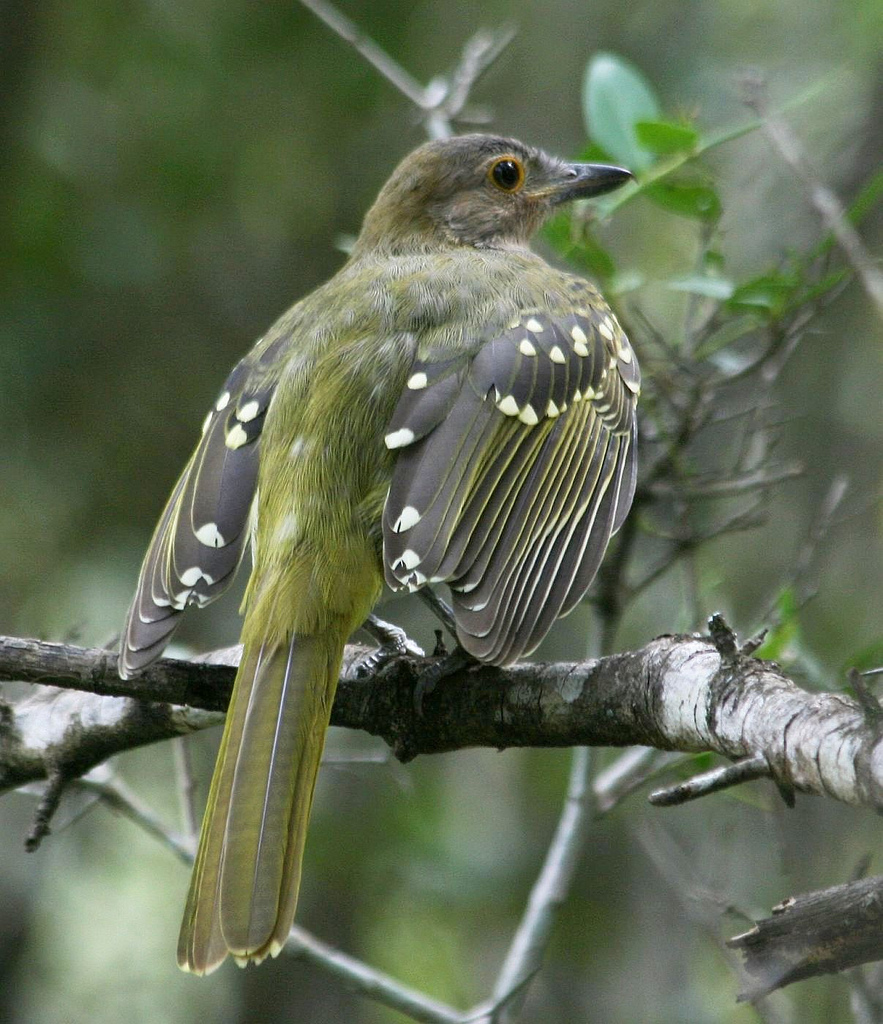
- A juvenile in begging pose, Mkhuze Game Reserve, KwaZulu-Natal, South Africa.

Conservation status
- Least Concern (IUCN 3.1)

Scientific classification
- Kingdom: Animalia
- Phylum: Chordata
- Class: Aves
- Order: Passeriformes
- Family: Nicatoridae
- Genus: Nicator
- Species: N. gularis

Binomial name
- Nicator gularis Hartlaub & Finsch, 1870
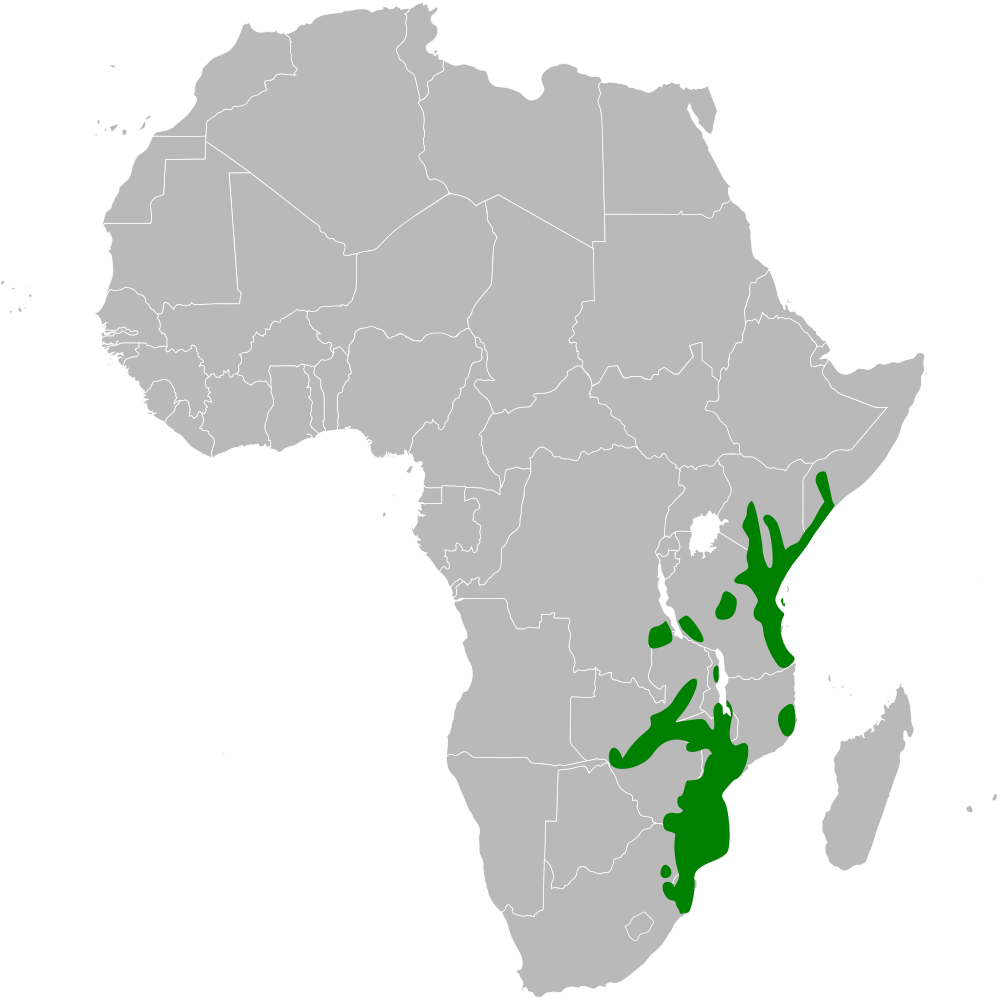

= Eastern nicator =

Species of songbird

The eastern nicator (Nicator gularis) is a species of songbird in the family Nicatoridae. It is found in Eswatini, Kenya, Malawi, Mozambique, Somalia, South Africa, Tanzania, Zambia, and Zimbabwe. Its natural habitats are subtropical or tropical dry forests, dry savanna, and subtropical or tropical moist shrubland. It occurs south to around Mtunzini in northern KwaZulu-Natal, South Africa, and is regularly reported from lowland areas north through to east Africa, including inland areas along the Zambezi River.

This species was formerly called the "yellow-spotted nicator" although this is no longer the case, with that name now belonging solely to the central African western nicator.

== Diet ==
It is an insectivore.
