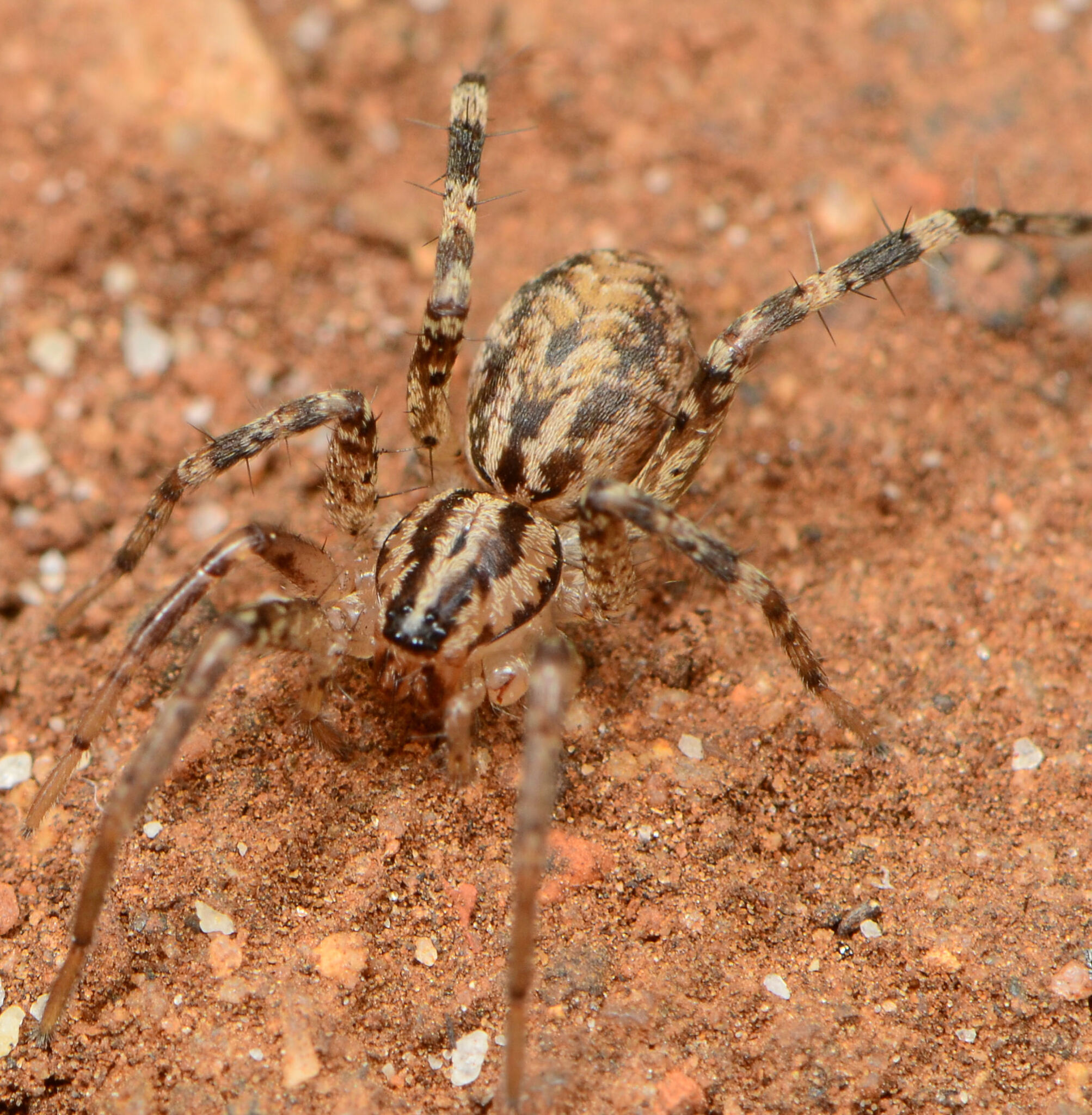
- Female
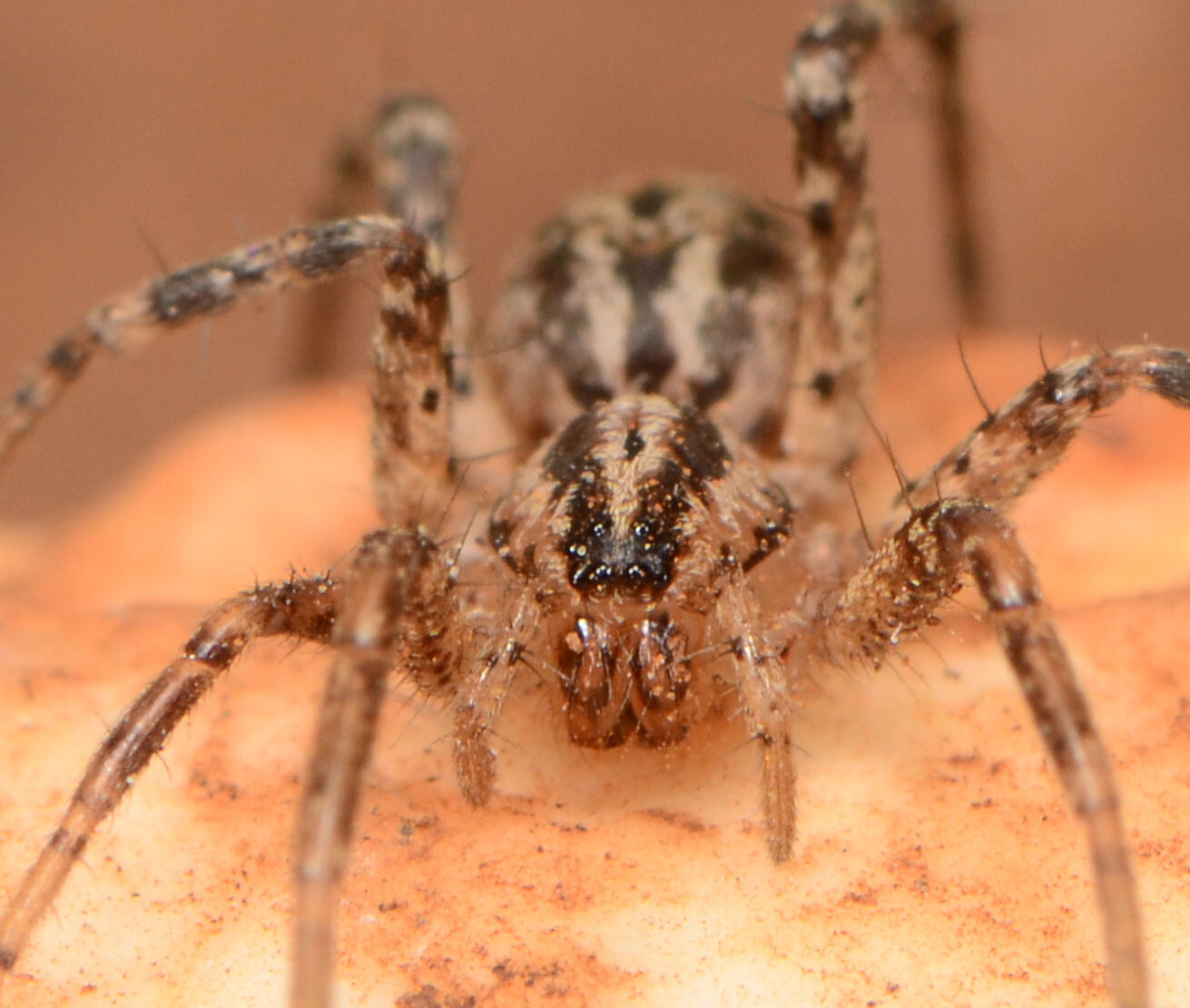
- Female

Scientific classification
- Kingdom: Animalia
- Phylum: Arthropoda
- Subphylum: Chelicerata
- Class: Arachnida
- Order: Araneae
- Infraorder: Araneomorphae
- Family: Corinnidae
- Genus: Copuetta
- Species: C. lacustris

Binomial name
- Copuetta lacustris (Strand, 1916)

Synonyms
- Copa lacustris Strand, 1916; Castianeira kibonotensis Lessert, 1921

= Copuetta lacustris =

African tree lycosiform sac spider

Species of spider

Copuetta lacustris is a species of spider in the family Corinnidae. It is widely distributed in Central, East, and Southern Africa and is commonly known as the African tree lycosiform sac spider.

== Distribution ==
Copuetta lacustris occurs in Central, East, and Southern Africa, including Botswana, Eswatini, Lesotho, Mozambique, Zimbabwe, and South Africa.

In South Africa, it is found in all nine provinces at altitudes ranging from 4 to 1,676 m above sea level.

The species has been recorded from numerous locations across South Africa, including Karoo National Park, Free State National Botanical Gardens, Kruger National Park, and Lowveld National Botanical Gardens.

== Habitat and ecology ==
Copuetta lacustris is a free-living spider found from ground level to the tree canopy in a wide range of habitats. The species inhabits Grassland, Nama Karoo, Forest, Fynbos, and Savanna biomes.

The species is frequently collected in urban areas and is often seen inside houses at night, especially during spring.

Egg sacs are approximately 8 mm in diameter and are constructed under bark in natural habitats and under window sills, door frames, and wooden structures in and around houses. It has also been collected from pistachio orchards, maize fields, and vineyards.

== Description ==
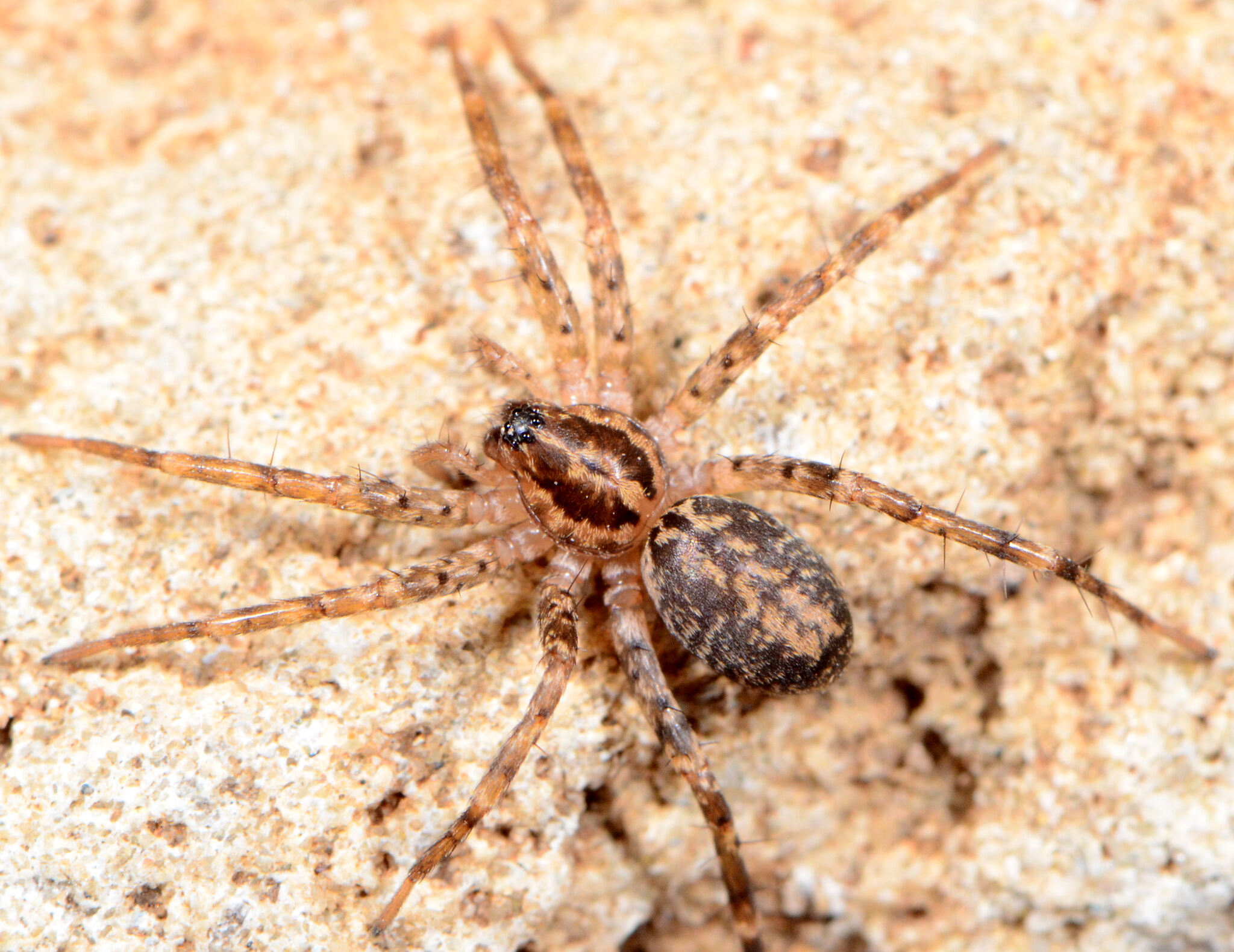
Female

Copuetta lacustris is known from both sexes. As a member of genus Copuetta, it is a medium to large spider with a smooth carapace featuring black feathery setae forming different markings.

== Conservation ==
Copuetta lacustris is listed as Least Concern by the South African National Biodiversity Institute due to its wide geographical range. The species faces no significant threats and has been recorded from several protected areas.

== Taxonomy ==
The species was originally described by Embrik Strand in 1916 as Copa lacustris from the Democratic Republic of the Congo. It was redescribed by Haddad in 2013, who transferred it to the genus Copuetta and synonymized Castianeira kibonotensis Lessert, 1921.
