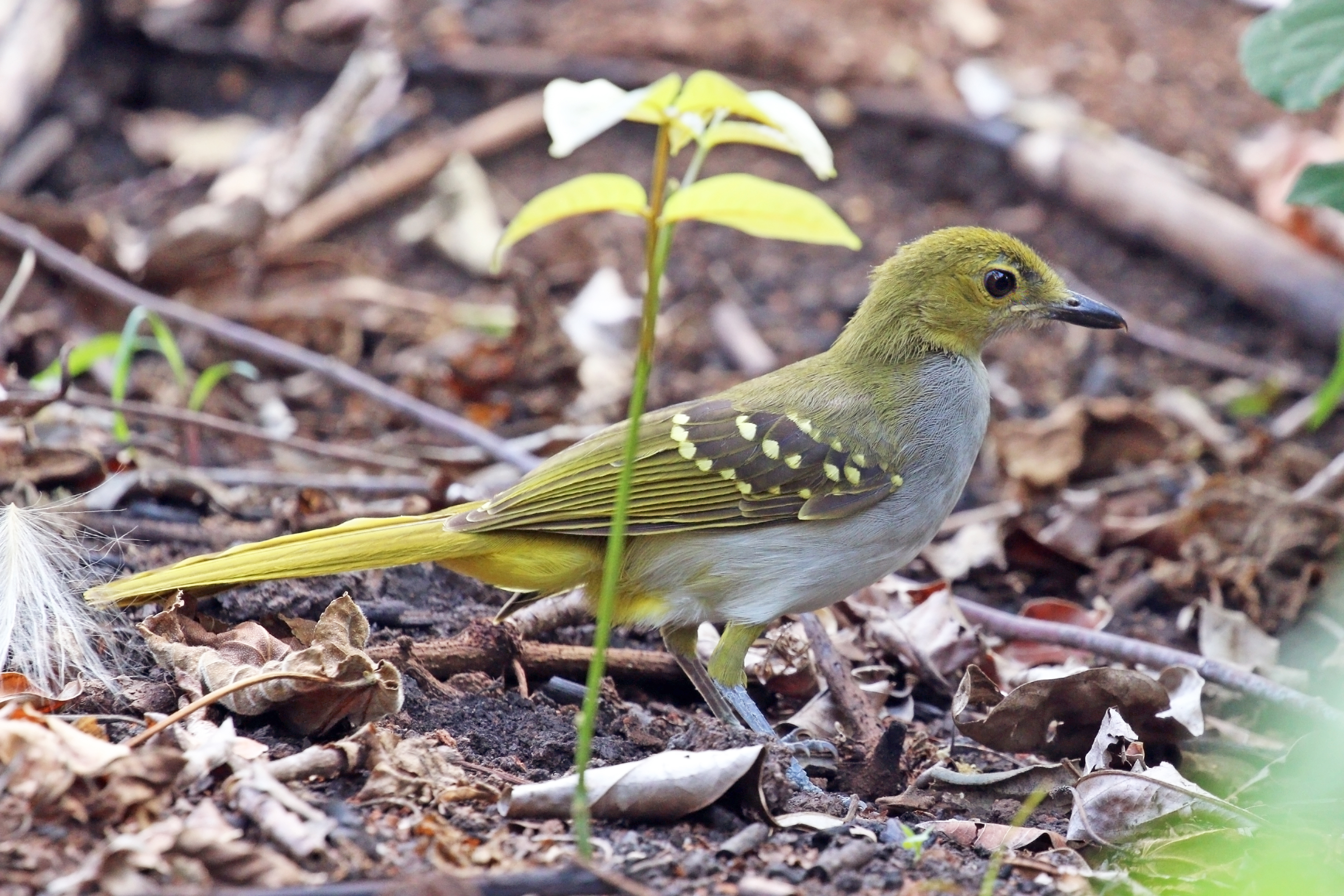
- Juvenile in Kibale Forest, Uganda

Conservation status
- Least Concern (IUCN 3.1)

Scientific classification
- Kingdom: Animalia
- Phylum: Chordata
- Class: Aves
- Order: Passeriformes
- Family: Nicatoridae
- Genus: Nicator
- Species: N. chloris

Binomial name
- Nicator chloris (Valenciennes, 1826)
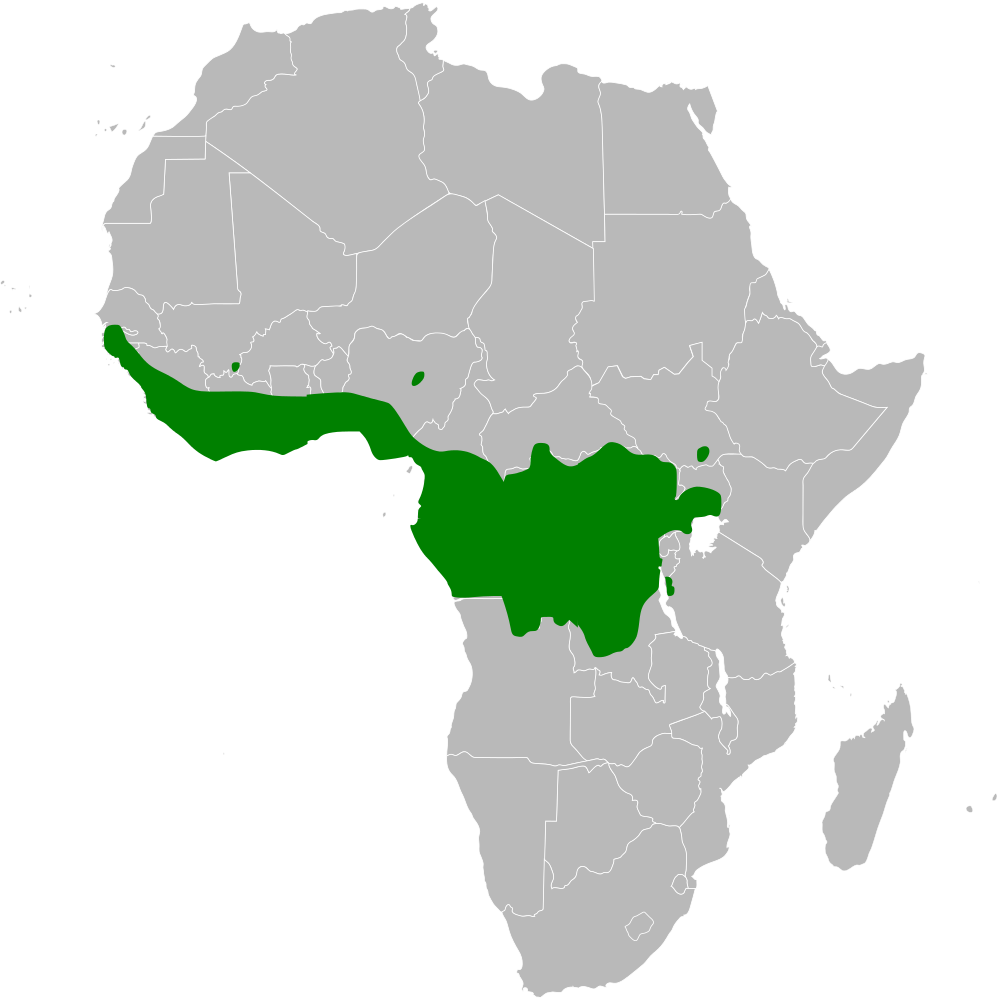

= Western nicator =

Species of songbird

The western nicator (Nicator chloris) is a species of songbird in the family Nicatoridae.

== Description ==
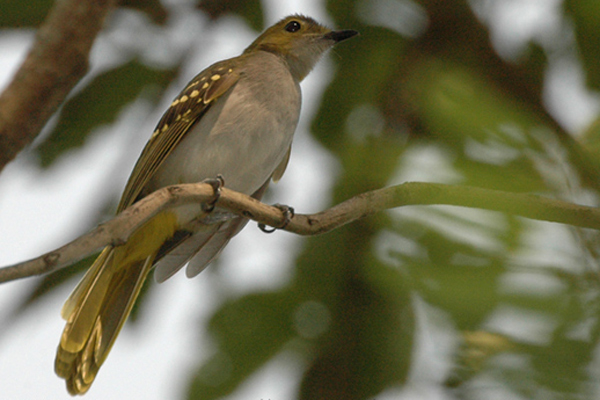
A western nicator in Uganda

It is very similar to the eastern nicator, but the sides of the face and crown are olive green. It is best identified by its range and some of its vocalizations.

== Range ==
It is mainly native to the African tropical rainforest.

== Habitat ==
It inhabits subtropical or tropical moist lowland forest and subtropical or tropical swamps. It prefers well-established secondary growth forest from 700 to 1,850 metres (2,300 to 6,070 ft).
