= Tony Pooley =

South African naturalist (1938–2004)

Tony Pooley

Tony Charles (Mashesha) Pooley (1938–2004) was a South African naturalist, award-winning conservationist and one of the world's foremost authorities on the Nile crocodile.

Pooley spent his first years at Isipingo, KwaZulu-Natal, where he spent much time in the wetlands and seashore, collected snakes and became a keen ornithologist as a youth. He began his training as a game ranger for the (then) Natal Parks Board in Maputaland (now northern KwaZulu-Natal, also formerly known as Tongaland) in 1957, receiving much of his training as a naturalist from Zulu and Thonga game guards. The guards showed him a crocodile egg and asked him to identify which bird had laid it, to general amusement, which started his interest in crocodiles. His pioneering work on crocodile ecology and conservation are recorded, with his customary humour, in his first book, Discoveries of a Crocodile Man (Collins, 1982).

Pooley published numerous papers and chapters in books on crocodile behavior, made pioneering discoveries on crocodile maternal care, and croc-rearing techniques (see Further Reading, below). He assisted in drafting new regulations changing the status of Nile crocodiles from 'vermin' to 'protected', and was a founder member of the IUCN Crocodile Specialist Group.

He traveled to Italy, Australia, America, Papua New Guinea, Zambia and Zimbabwe advising on crocodile conservation and farming. Several films were made about his work, including the SABC documentary Ndumu: The Story of Crocodile Survival in South Africa, and the BBC's award-winning Gently Smiling Jaws, narrated by Sir David Attenborough. Pooley set up two crocodile research facilities, one at Ndumo Game Reserve, and the St Lucia Crocodile Research Centre, where he also set about educating visitors about crocodiles and their place in the ecosystem. He earned his MSc degree, in the "Ecology of the Nile Crocodile in Zululand", from the University of Natal in 1982, despite never having completed high school.

After leaving the Natal Parks Board, he set up what was then southern Africa's largest private crocodile farm, Crocworld, near Scottburgh on the south coast of KwaZulu-Natal, which combined commercial farming with education (it is now a Conservation Centre). Thereafter he worked as a wildlife consultant and lectured at the Mangosuthu Technikon educating future African conservationists. As a consultant, Pooley worked with numerous film crews from the US, UK, France, Germany, South Africa and elsewhere, including the BBC Natural History Unit and the Discovery Channel. These programmes and films included special features on crocodiles, a film on the interaction of humans and vervet monkeys, and documentaries on conservation issues. His last film for the BBC was Missing - Presumed Eaten, documenting his successful defence of the reputation of the Nile crocodile against a life-insurance scam. He also made and published records of wildlife sounds, and an album of Thonga music.

Pooley was one of the leading defenders of the dunes at Lake St. Lucia, now part of the Greater St. Lucia Wetland Park, a UNESCO World Heritage Park. He was chairman of the Campaign for St Lucia, which helped to defend the park against proposed open-cast dune mining and get it proclaimed as a heritage park, and later coordinated a campaign preventing the deproclamation of part of the Ndumo Game Reserve. This campaign is ongoing. Tony's efforts as a conservationist were recognised by awards from The Wildlife Society and Ezemvelo KZN Wildlife (formerly the Natal Parks Board).

Pooley's best-known publication is probably Mashesha - The Making of a Game Ranger, first published by Southern Book Publishers in 1992. "Mashesha" can be basically translated from Zulu as "He who hurries and takes", a reference to Pooley's work in pursuing poachers, though in Mashesha he reflects on the moral quandaries of arresting poachers inside the reserve given the struggles of the rural poor living around the reserve.

Pooley died in late 2004. He is survived by his wife, Elsa, an artist who illustrated Mashesha and has published definitive guides on South African plant life and three sons: Simon (who also contributes to crocodile conservation; specifically on human-wildlife conflict and coexistence), Justin (senior environmental, social, and corporate governance (ESG) with the IFC) and Thomas (musicologist: ethnomusicology and music cognition).
