= Thomas Pooley =

- Born: c. 1788; Cornwall, England
- Died: c. 1846 (aged 57–58)
- Occupation: Businessman
- Known for: Creating the modern town of Surbiton with the arrival of the railway
- Spouse: Jane

Thomas Pooley (c. 1788 – 1846 or later) was a Cornishman who moved to London to seek his fortune. Having amassed sufficient wealth, he settled in Kingston-upon-Thames, where he operated several malthouses.

After the arrival of the London and Southampton Railway, soon renamed London and South Western Railway, a little way to the south of Kingston, he conceived the idea of building a new town adjacent to the railway. He built houses for relatively wealthy people who worked in London, but wished to live in the more salubrious air of the countryside. Pooley was thus one of the early developers of the concept of commuting.

His project established the nucleus of what became the modern town of Surbiton, but opposition from competing interests forced him into bankruptcy and he disappeared from history in his late 50s.

== Before Kingston ==
It is clear from surviving records that Thomas Pooley and his wife Jane came originally from Cornwall. However, Thomas was not sure when he was born, stating in 1844 that he was "54, 56 or 58, I cannot say which".

Some time in the early 19th century the Pooleys moved to London. They settled in Old Street in Finsbury and Thomas earned sufficient to allow him to amass considerable wealth.

== Life in Kingston ==
By 1838 the Pooleys were living in the more pleasant surroundings of Kingston-upon-Thames, also known at that time as Kingston-on-Thames. Thomas ran three malthouses and his son Alexander ran another. In addition to his malting operations, Thomas owned three cargo vessels, the Agnes, the Elizabeth and the Mahon Castle.

Despite his success in business, Pooley was seen by the business community of Kingston as being of the lower orders and not quite respectable. However, Alexander married into a local family. His wife Jane was the daughter of William Wadbrook, also a successful maltster, who came from a line of Kingston watermen.

== The coming of the railway ==
The builders of the London and Southampton Railway had hoped to take the line north of Surbiton Hill and put a station somewhere to the south of Kingston. However, the men who ran Kingston saw the railway as a threat to the town's coaching and inn-keeping trades and refused to allow the line to pass through their territory. It therefore proved necessary for a cutting to be dug through Surbiton Hill. A station was built in the cutting, close to the Ewell road. In theory, this station served Kingston, but it was a long way from the town.

Christopher Terry was a gentleman farmer noted for being a good employer. He owned Maple Farm, just south of the hamlet of Surbiton, and he died there at the age of 93 in 1838, just as the railway was being built nearby. In his will he directed that his estate be sold and the proceeds divided between the beneficiaries.

When the land was auctioned, there was little interest. However, Thomas Pooley realized the potential of this land and bought a large part of it for the modest sum of £10,500. He planned to build a new town, which would be called New Kingston or Kingston-(up)on-Railway, and hoped to attract people who wanted rapid access to London.

Within weeks, a London consortium offered Pooley £120,000 for the land, but he refused the quick profit, because he was keen to see his project through.

== The new town ==
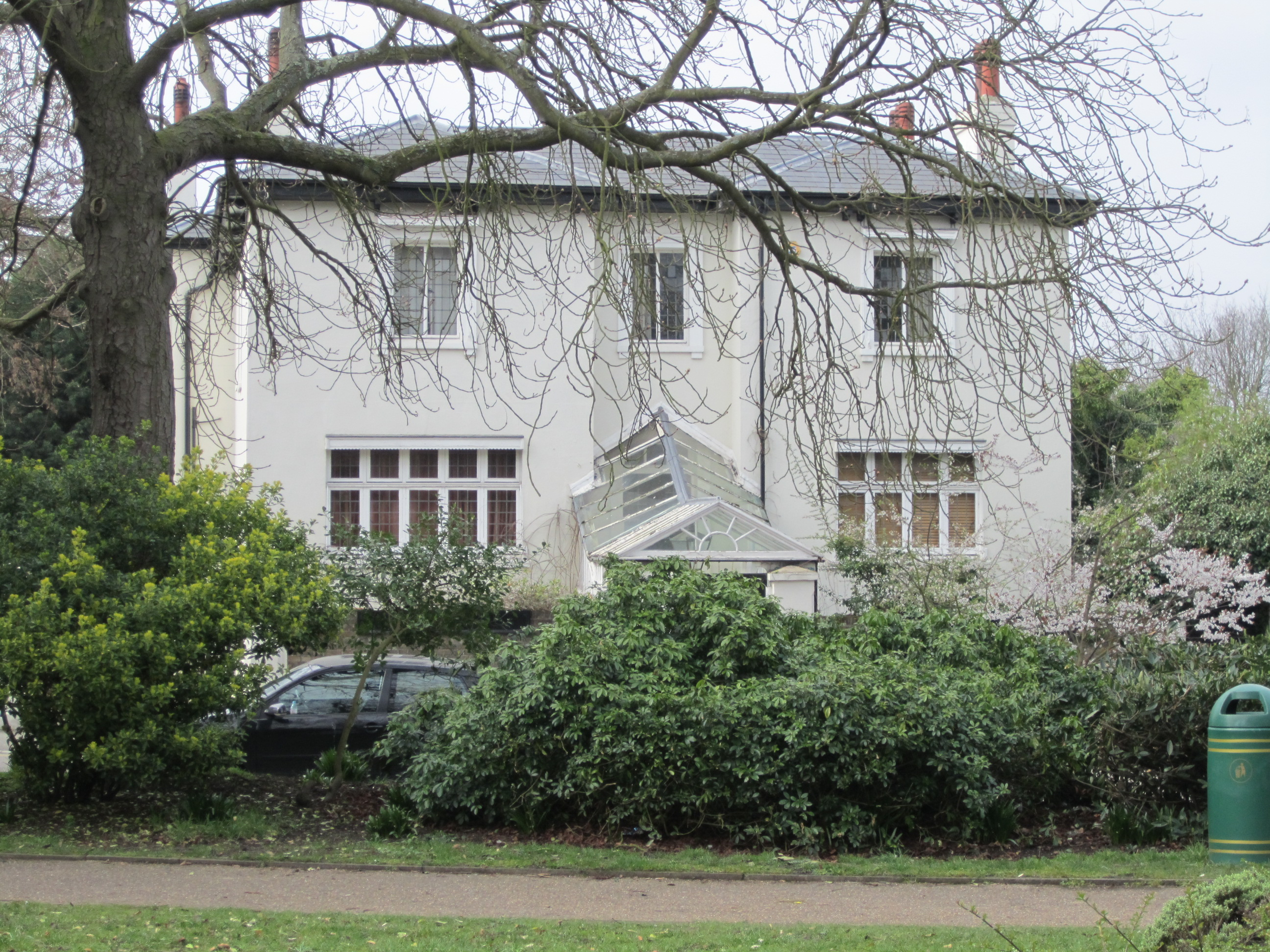
House in The Crescent seen from Claremont Crescent Gardens. Photo: LynwoodF.

The scheme moved ahead rapidly, because Pooley took personal control of it and he threw himself into it with enthusiasm. He drew up plans and engaged an architect, engineers, builders and labourers. He supervised the project closely, moving about the area to ensure that all was progressing well.

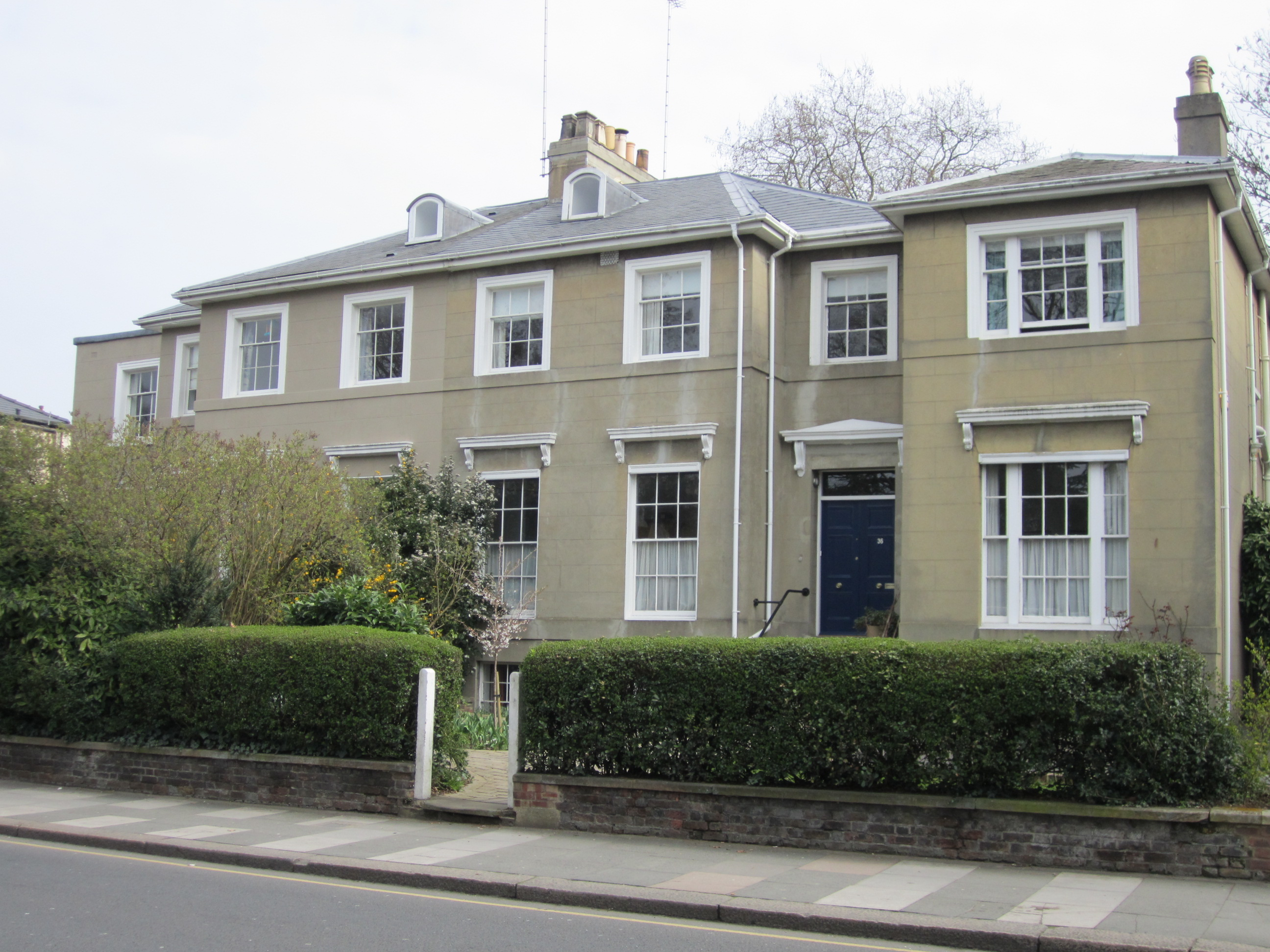
More Pooley houses in Claremont Road. Photo: LynwoodF.

By the 1841 census Thomas and Jane were living in a new house in Claremont Crescent, now The Crescent, and Alexander, who appears to have given up other employment to assist his father, had moved into a house in Victoria Terrace, now a row of shops in Victoria Road close to the station.

The original station, approached by way of a steep descent into the cutting, soon proved to be wholly inadequate. So in 1839 Pooley gave land for a new station to be built on the present site, which is adjacent to an important road junction.

In August 1840, and again in October, The Times praised Pooley's enterprise in creating this remarkable development. Wide streets and a crescent were lined with handsome houses.

== Downfall and disappearance ==
The newspaper's enthusiasm was not, however, matched by the business community of Kingston, which was becoming apprehensive about Pooley's success. When he proposed the building of a corn market near the station, leading businessmen put forward a proposal to build one in Kingston and persuaded the Council to block Pooley's scheme. In the end neither scheme was realized.

This was but one episode in a campaign to bring Pooley down. There is no evidence that anything illegal was done, but there seems to have been a concerted effort to get rid of this 'upstart'.

Pooley had needed to borrow heavily to finance the project and this was his Achilles' heel. In January 1842 Coutts Bank refused to lend him any more and creditors closed in on him. Unpaid seamen were after his blood. It appears that Pooley's own solicitors had been part of the plot to bring him down, warning Coutts of the growing antagonism of the Kingston establishment.

Things became increasingly difficult for Pooley. After building work had been suspended because of lack of funds, partly completed houses were vandalized. This seems to have been an attempt by unidentified parties to reduce the value of his assets and hasten his capitulation.

Coutts refused Pooley's offer to hand over his holdings in exchange for a life annuity of £1,000. Eventually, in June 1842 Pooley was forced to hand over his holdings in the new town to his creditors' trustees. Apparently there was a gentlemen's agreement to pay him £5 a week. He fled to Boulogne and lived in poverty.

This was not the end of Pooley's misery. His £5 a week allowance was withdrawn and Alexander, his son, was taken dangerously ill. In January 1844 Thomas returned to England, landing at Greenwich and staying in Surrey, where there was no writ against him.

Attempts were made to persuade Pooley to sign away his claims on the new town. There were violent altercations in a solicitor's office and at one point Thomas was about to be taken to prison. Despite his illness, Alexander was arrested for one of his father's debts. Eventually, Thomas was plied with drink and prevailed upon to sign.

The next day Pooley changed his mind. He filed complaints in the Chancery Court and these were still unsettled two years later, when a new tragedy struck. In 1846 Jane, Alexander's wife, died at 28, leaving three small children.

In 1846 Pooley disappears from history, his court cases unsettled. No record of his death has been found, so it is possible that he died abroad.

- Note: The above version of events is largely in line with the story as recounted by Sampson. Statham's later book gives a more detailed account with a somewhat different chronology. However, the overall shape of the story is essentially the same.

== Aftermath ==
Alexander Pooley continued the legal battles, without success, until the early 1850s, when he, too, disappears from history. It seems that his son, Thomas Alexander, returned to the world of brewing.

The new town soon came to be known as Surbiton. This name had previously referred principally to the hamlet of Kingston parish spread out along what is now Surbiton Road. Streets and buildings were renamed to remove any reference to the Pooleys and their relatives.

There is now a residential block in Surbiton called Thomas Pooley Court, along with a group of streets just north of the station, where some of his houses survive.

== Gallery ==
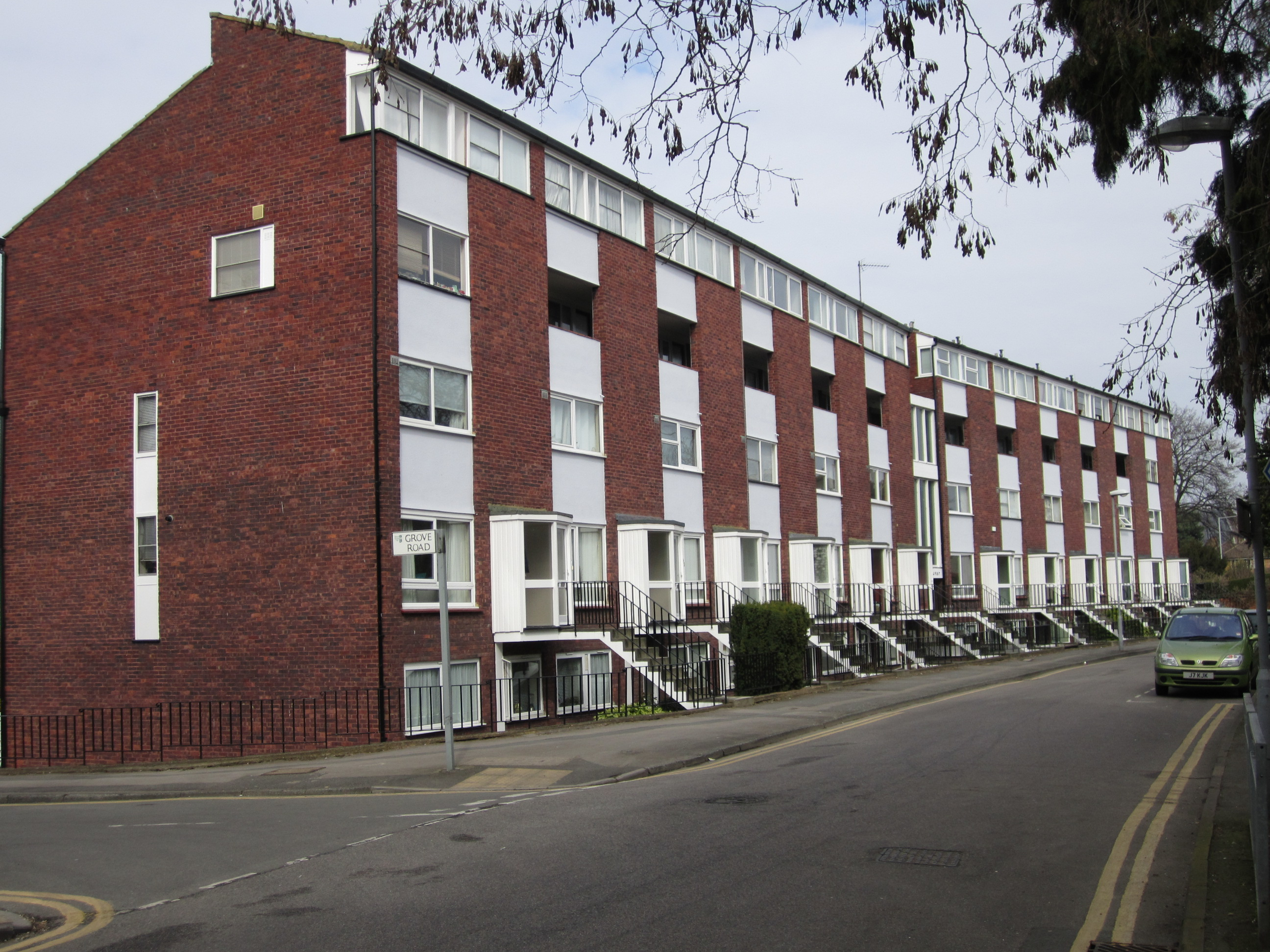
The 20th century version of the crescent terrace. Falconhurst in The Crescent, Surbiton, at the heart of Pooley's development.

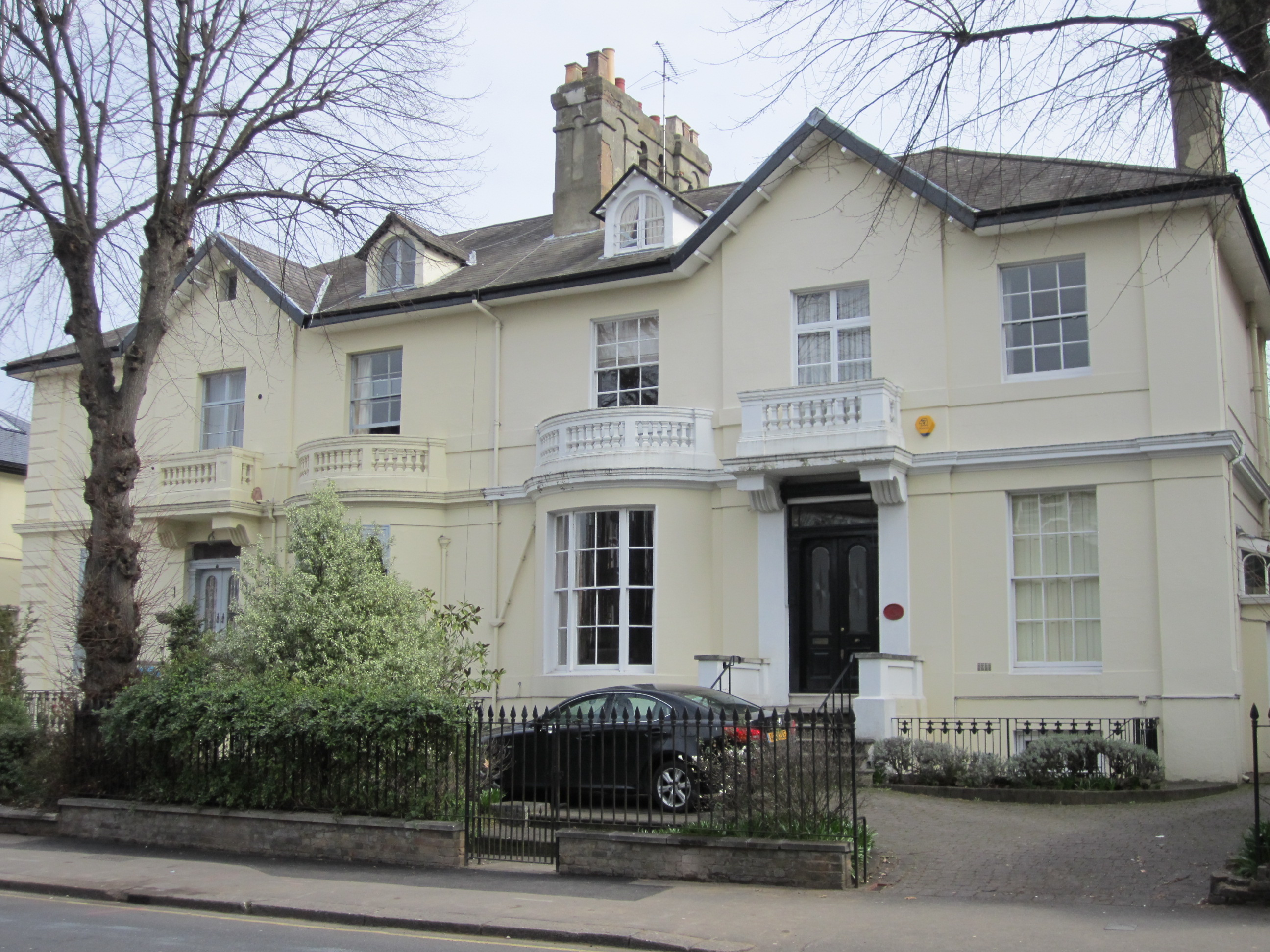
Houses in Claremont Road, Surbiton built by Thomas Pooley.

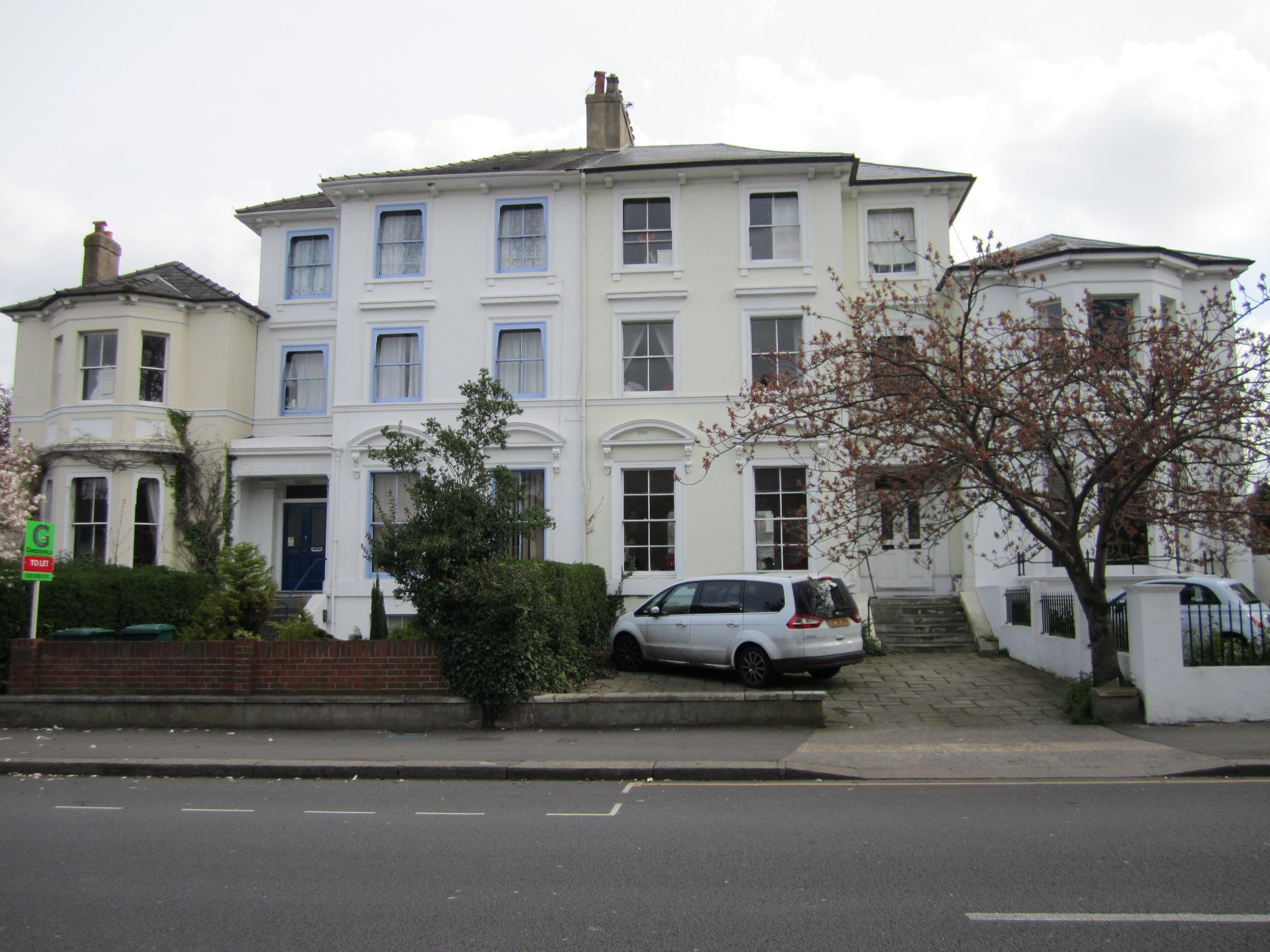
Another group of Victorian houses in Claremont Road, Surbiton. They are situated almost opposite Falconhurst.

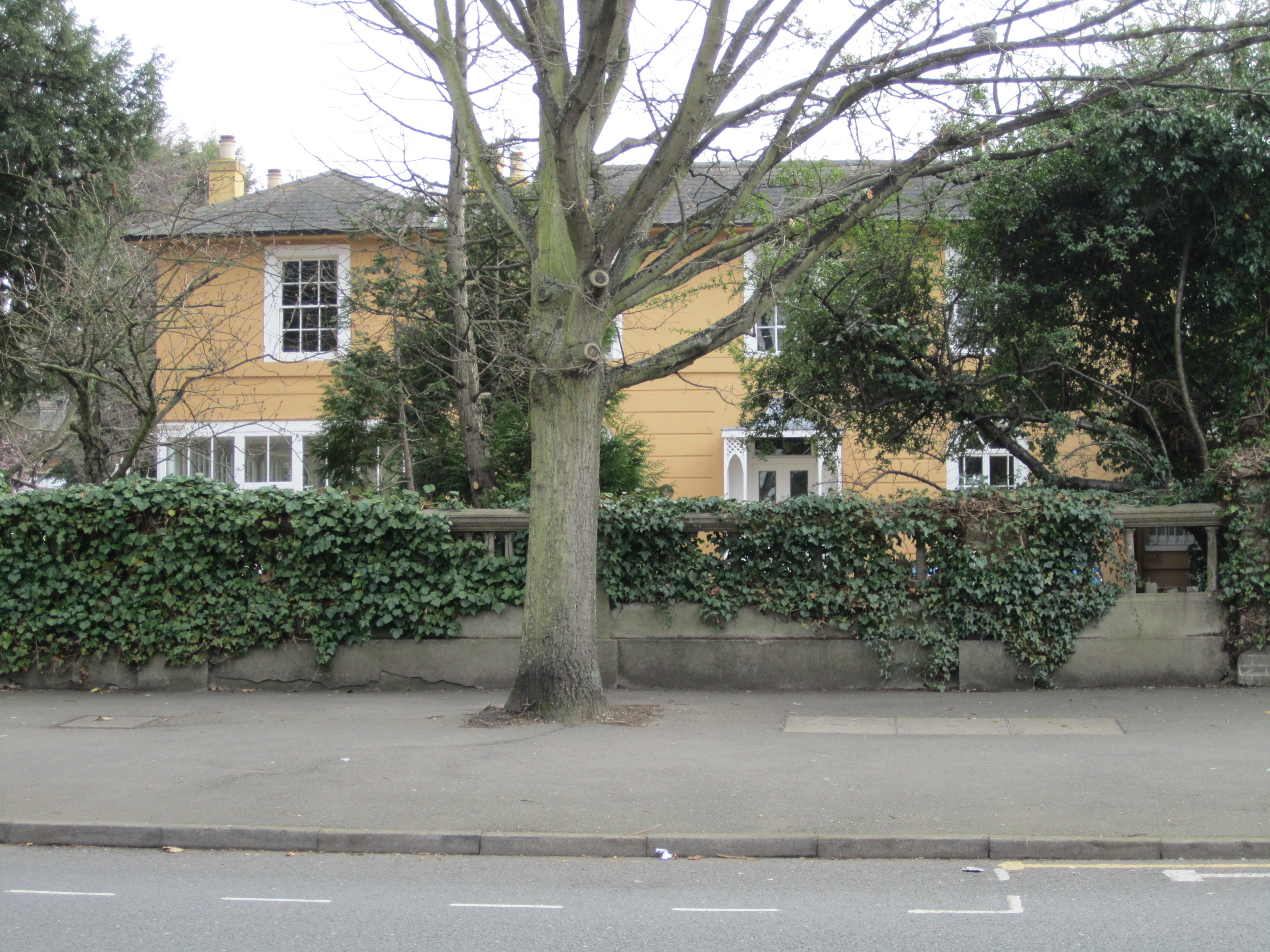
Secluded Pooley house in Maple Road, Surbiton. It is just south of the site of the house where Christopher Terry lived and died.

== Sources ==
These include:

- June Sampson: All Change; Kingston, Surbiton & New Malden in the 19th century. (News Origin, Kingston, 1985, revd 1991).
- Richard Statham: Surbiton Past. (Phillimore, Chichester, 1996).
- Shaan Butters: The Book of Kingston. (Baron Birch, 1995).
