= Ndumo Game Reserve =

South African game reserve in Maputaland

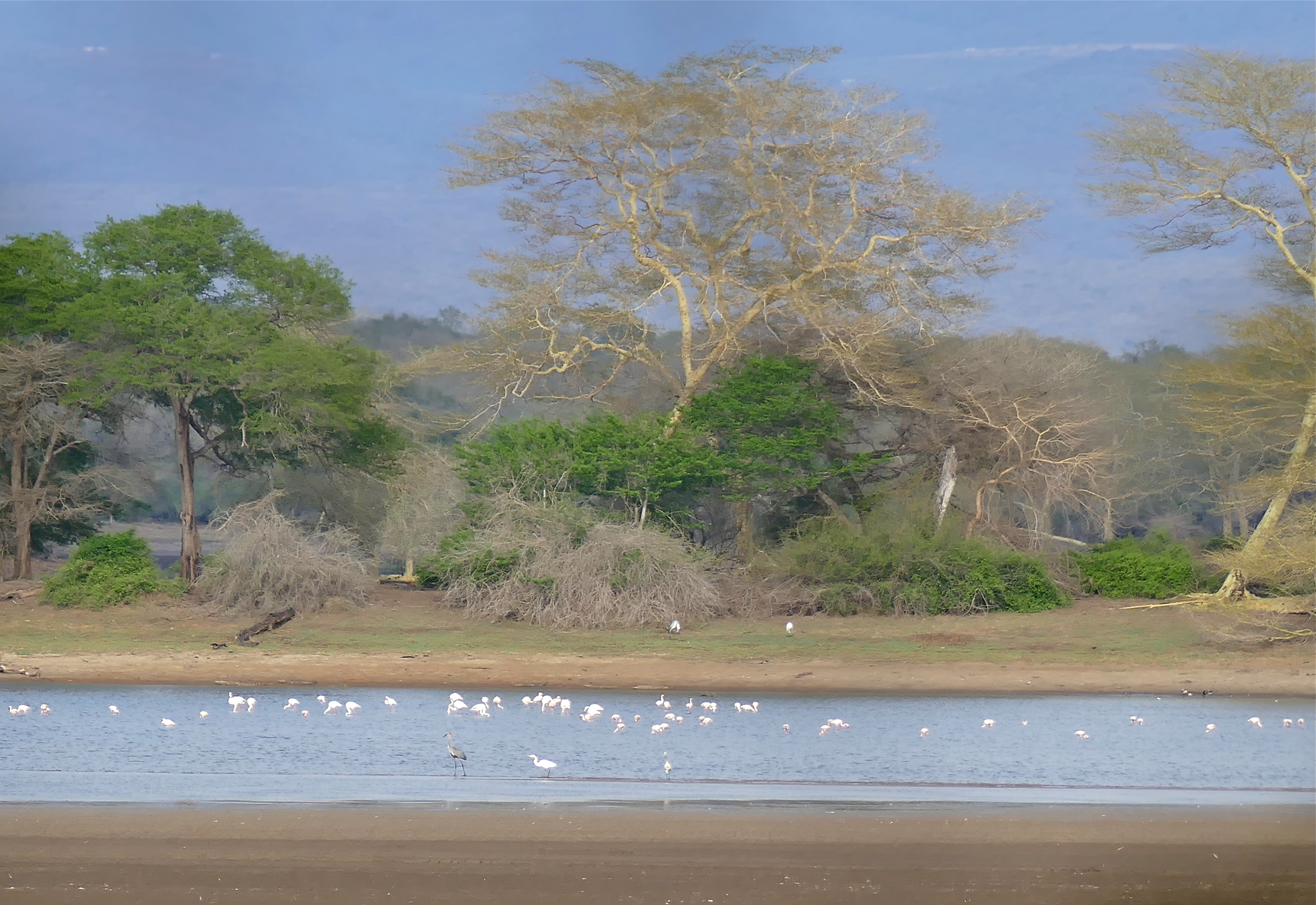

- Location within KwaZulu-Natal
- Location: KwaZulu-Natal, South Africa
- Nearest city: Mkuze, Kwa-Zulu Natal
- Coordinates: 26°54′43″S 32°15′48″E
- Area: 102 km^{2} (39 sq mi)
- Established: 1924
- Governing body: Ezemvelo KZN Wildlife

Ramsar Wetland
- Designated: 21 January 1997
- Reference no.: 887

Ndumo Game Reserve is a small (11,000 hectares (27,000 acres)) South African game reserve famous for its wetlands which shelter hippopotamus, crocodiles, fish and a diversity of birdlife. It is located in the far northeast corner of KwaZulu-Natal known as Maputaland. Situated on the border with Mozambique where the Pongola River joins the Great Usutu River. Adjacent to the Tembe Elephant Park. Ndumo is relatively remote, over 400 kilometres (250 mi) from Durban. The town of Mkuze is 110 kilometres (68 mi) away.

Ndumo hosts a diverse range of habitats including sand forest, dense riverine forest, floodplains, alluvial plains, reed beds, grassland, broad-leaved and acacia woodlands and extremely dense thornveld. Ndumo is popular for its birdlife and despite its small size, the reserve has in excess of 430 bird species including residents and seasonal migrants. The park's abundance of pans, floodplains and rivers (Pongola & Usutu) provide ideal habitat for many aquatic species.

The Maputaland area in general is relatively rich in birdlife due to ecosystem diversity as well as its geographical location: the area forms the southernmost range for a great many eastern and north-eastern African bird species. The area receives high annual rainfall.

A short list of bird species resident in Ndumo:

- Pel's fishing owl
- Narina trogon
- African broadbill
- Eastern nicator (formerly "yellow-spotted nicator" but this name is now given to another bird, the western nicator)
- African cuckoo-hawk

Large mammals found in Ndumo include nyala, hippopotamus, impala, giraffe and Cape buffalo. Big cats are absent from the park. Elephants are prolific at the neighbouring Tembe Elephant Park.

The park is rich in frogs and herpetofauna, and is one of South Africa's remaining sanctuaries for Nile crocodile. In the 1960s and 1970s, Tony Pooley conducted pioneering crocodile research and conservation work here, from the Experimental Crocodile Restocking Station he established on the Phongolo floodplain, below the rest camp. However, illegal utilisation of the Phongolo floodplain inside the reserve since 2010 is endangering the crocodile population and disrupting their ancestral breeding grounds.

As with all parts of Maputaland, malaria is endemic and visitors are advised to take precautions.

There is an Ezemvelo KZN Wildlife campsite and hutted camp. There are several hides and picnic areas, and a four-wheel-drive track. Guided drives and walks are offered.

This park is to be included into the: Usuthu-Tembe-Futi Transfrontier Conservation Area should it materialise.

== Conservation and social history ==
In 1924, the area that is now the Ndumo Game Reserve was declared a protected area (a provincial game reserve) by the South African government. This was principally to protect the hippopotamus living in its pans and stretches of the Usuthu and Pongola rivers.

In the 1950s and 60s, the local inhabitants were systematically and forcibly evicted from their homesteads and fields inside the reserve boundaries, which were fenced. The resident community had been growing, and with their tilled fields, burning practices, dogs and livestock were judged inimical to the reserve's declared conservation function. It was decided to evict families as and when conservation regulations were broken and convictions upheld, a process completed in 1966.

Although the Ndumo communities legally contested their right to the land, with a land claim settled in their favour in 2000, they were denied the right to resettle the land, instead given financial restitution and (in theory) a say in management. One resident recalls their period of residence as follows:

There we were rich; we ate sweet potatoes, bananas, madumbe [root vegetable], cassava and pumpkins. We drank from the Usuthu River. Today that river is reserved for the hippos and crocodiles while our children die from drought. The wild fruits are left to fatten the monkeys, and the rhinos graze on the graves of our ancestors.

The unresolved dispute over control of this land and ongoing issues with Community Based Natural Resource Management as a conservation model in the province, along with unemployment and unfulfilled promises of development, has resulted in the anomalous situation that the eastern part of this declared provincial game reserve has been illegally fished, grazed and farmed since 2010, despite its status as a Ramsar wetland of international importance, declared in 1997.

Farmland is replacing the indigenous vegetation and wildlife, formerly important hippopotamus habitat and winter grazing grounds, crocodiles no longer nest along the river which was their historical nesting area in the reserve.

CENTENARY AND AN UNCERTAIN FUTURE

Ndumo Game Reserve's centenary in 2024 went largely unremarked aside from a couple of newspaper articles. A special issue of African Journal of Wildlife Research was in development, celebrating the long legacy of scientific research in the Reserve and included papers on its management history, and future prospects.

Efforts have been underway since 2021 to get Ndumo Game Reserve listed as a threatened Ramsar site, and referred to the country's Department of Forestry, Fisheries and Environment (DFFE) as a priority for intervention. This has proved complicated given the many agencies involved.

In 2025 Ramsar SA agreed the site was threatened, but this led to no further Ramsar action. The South African authorities said they had their own national initiative in place for assessing the status of protected areas and recommended management actions (something first claimed in 2021). The DFFE responded, they were waiting for a statement by the Department of Water and Sanitation on the ecological and social classification of river catchments including those flowing through Ndumo.

As of August 2025, DFFE are awaiting a final report from the provincial conservation authority Ezemvelo KZN Wildlife, before submitting the country's long overdue Ramsar update report on the status of Ndumo Game Reserve. What remains to be determined is what actions will be taken to remedy the situation and restore and protect this unique reserve and its precious African wetlands.
