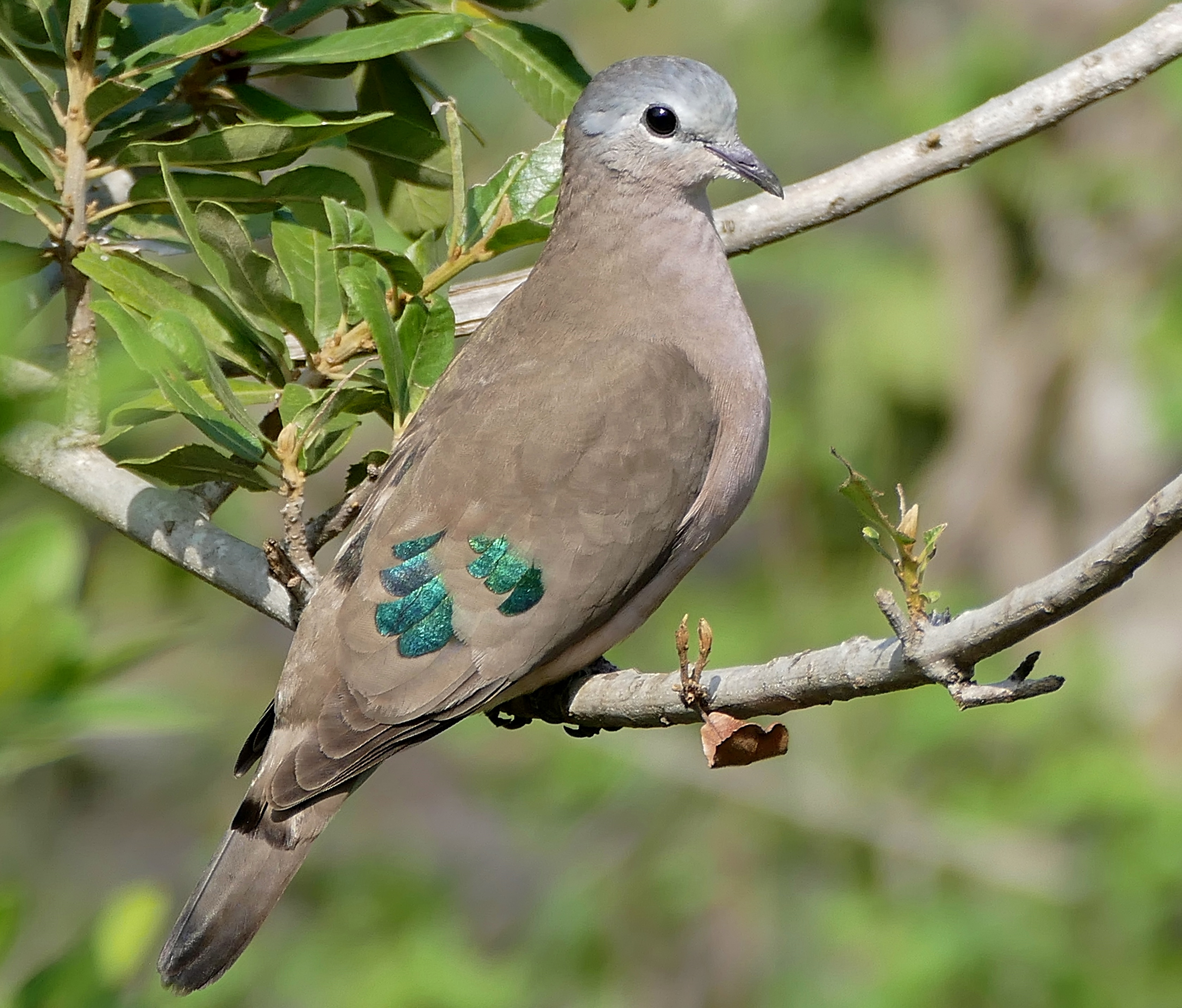

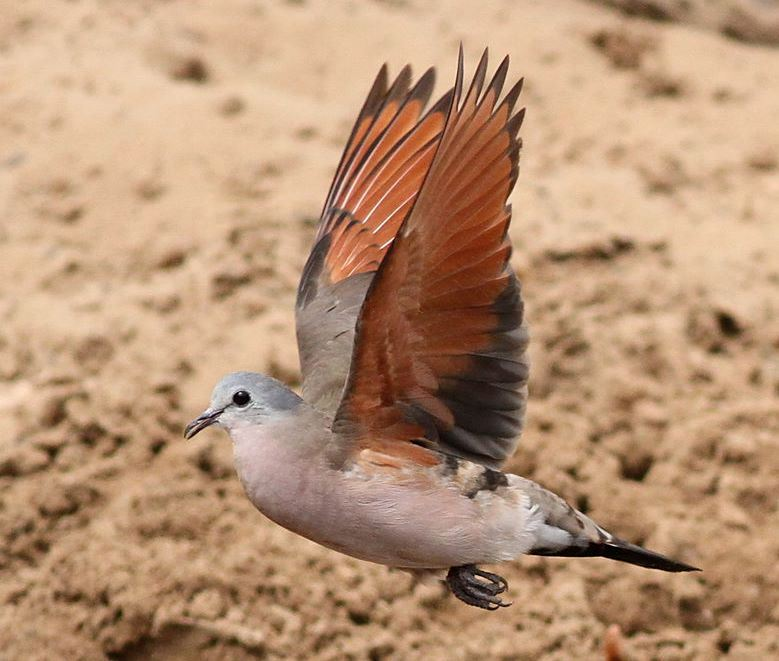
- At Hluhluwe-Umfolozi and uMkhuze Game Reserves respectively

Conservation status
- Least Concern (IUCN 3.1)

Scientific classification
- Kingdom: Animalia
- Phylum: Chordata
- Class: Aves
- Order: Columbiformes
- Family: Columbidae
- Genus: Turtur
- Species: T. chalcospilos

Binomial name
- Turtur chalcospilos (Wagler, 1827)

= Emerald-spotted wood dove =

Species of bird

The emerald-spotted wood dove or emerald-spotted dove (Turtur chalcospilos) is a bird of the family Columbidae, resident across eastern and southern Africa. It is a species of open drier deciduous woodland and second growth. It is absent from evergreen rainforests and semidesert areas.

== Description ==
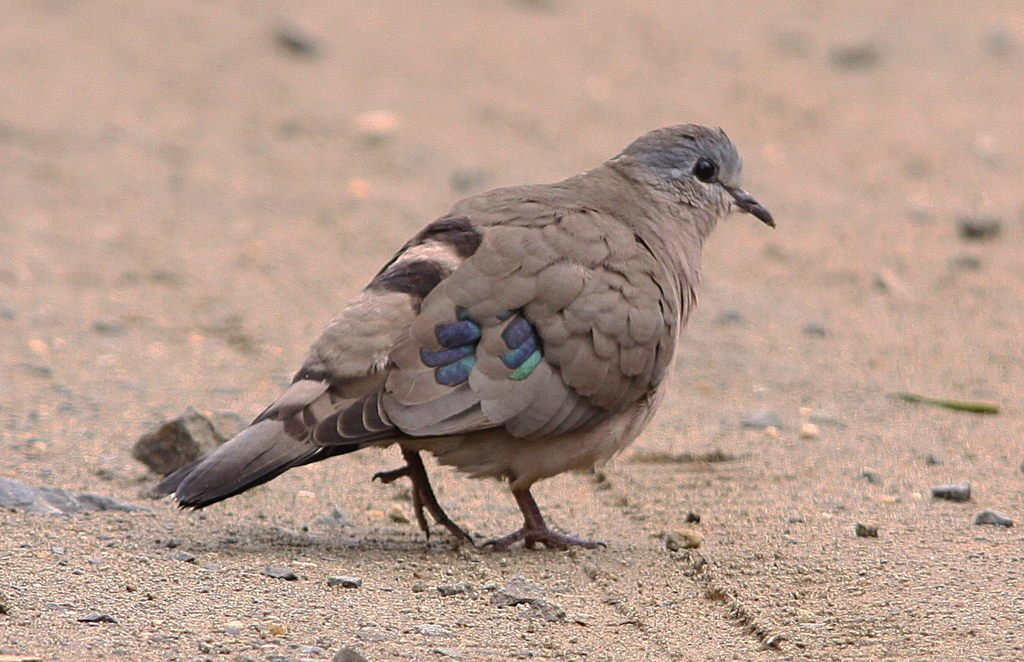
At Hluhluwe-Umfolozi, South Africa, showing the bluish-emerald wing spots

Calling in woodland during autumn

The emerald-spotted wood dove is a small plump pigeon, typically 20 cm in length. Its back, hindneck, wings, and tail are pale grey-brown, and the folded wings have green metallic patches. There are blackish bands on the lower back and tail. The forehead, crown, and nape are bluish-grey, fading to pinkish-grey on the throat. The underparts are mauve-pink, becoming whiter on the belly.

The bill of this dove is blackish with a red base. The sexes are similar, but the female may be slightly duller than the male. The immature has duller green spots and buff fringes to the feathers. When flying, the black-billed wood dove is told from this species by its bright chestnut underwings.

The call is in three parts: two soft long coos, followed by a series of slow descending coos lasting 10 seconds, and concluding with 4 seconds of rapid coos, which decrease in volume.

This species shows some geographical variation in plumage, but differences are clinal, and emerald-spotted wood dove is now considered to be monotypic.

== Behaviour ==
The emerald-spotted wood dove builds a flimsy stick nest in a tree or shrub, and lays two cream-coloured eggs. Both sexes incubate for 13–17 days to hatching, and feed the squabs for 13–17 days to fledging. Many young birds are taken by mongooses and shrikes.

The emerald-spotted wood dove is not gregarious, but flocks may form at waterholes. This species usually forages on the ground for grass and other small seeds.
