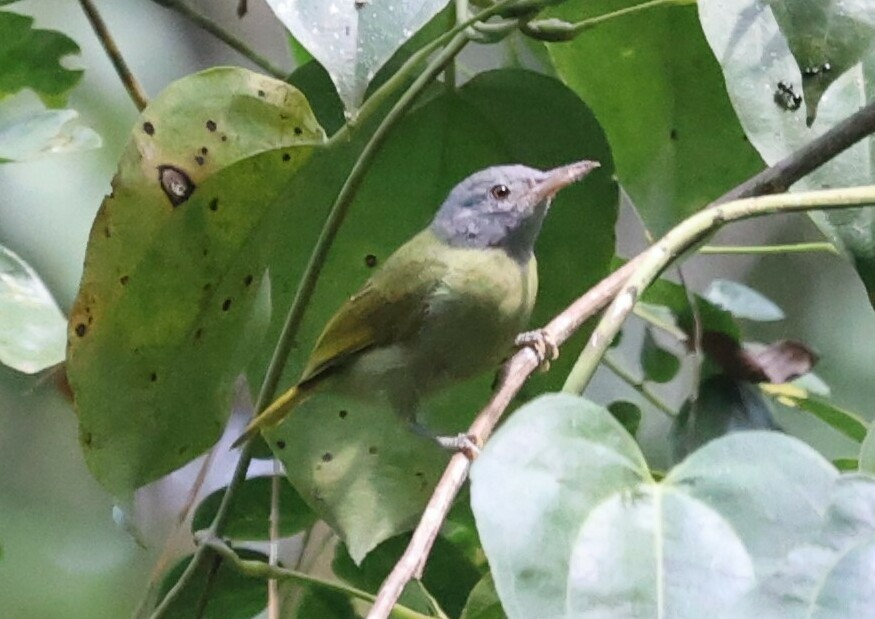

Conservation status
- Least Concern (IUCN 3.1)

Scientific classification
- Kingdom: Animalia
- Phylum: Chordata
- Class: Aves
- Order: Passeriformes
- Family: Nectariniidae
- Genus: Deleornis
- Species: D. axillaris

Binomial name
- Deleornis axillaris (Reichenow, 1893)

Synonyms
- Anthreptes axillaris Anthreptes fraseri axillaris Deleornis fraseri axillaris

= Grey-headed sunbird =

Species of bird

The grey-headed sunbird (Deleornis axillaris) is a small passerine bird which breeds in mixed forest in the Democratic Republic of the Congo and western Uganda.

This sunbird is sometimes treated as a subspecies of Fraser's sunbird, Deleornis fraseri, but is not known to intergrade. Both taxa are sometimes placed in Anthreptes.
