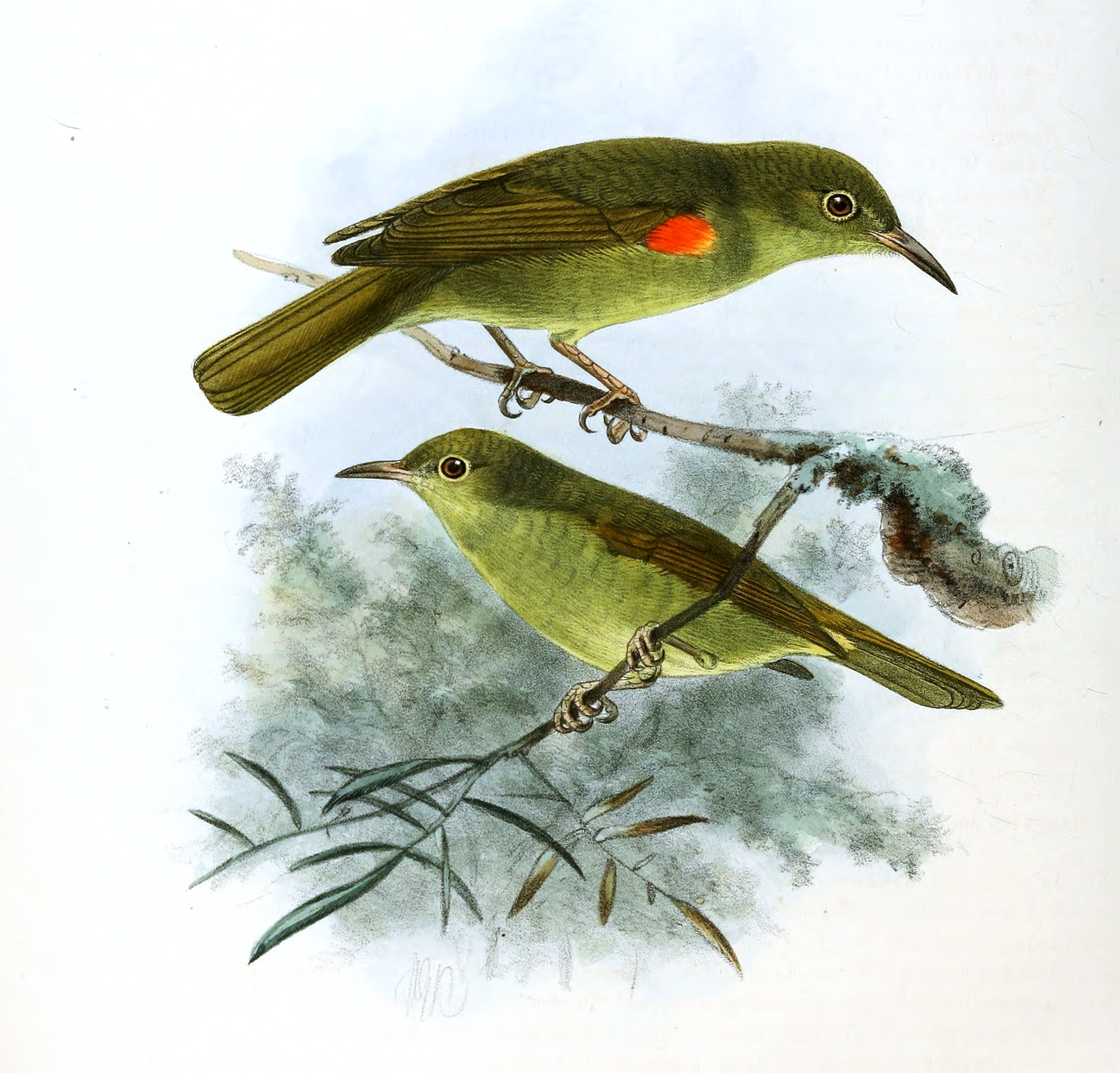
- D. fraseri by Keulemans

Scientific classification
- Kingdom: Animalia
- Phylum: Chordata
- Class: Aves
- Order: Passeriformes
- Family: Nectariniidae
- Genus: Deleornis; Wolters, 1977

Type species
- Anthreptes fraseri Jardine & Selby, 1843

Species
- D. fraseri D. axillaris

= Deleornis =

Genus of birds

Deleornis is a genus of African sunbirds. Its members are sometimes included in Anthreptes.

The genus contains the following two species:

Image	Common name	Scientific name	Distribution
	Fraser's sunbird	Deleornis fraseri	Angola, Cameroon, Central African Republic, Republic of the Congo, Democratic Republic of the Congo, Ivory Coast, Equatorial Guinea, Gabon, Ghana, Guinea, Liberia, Mali, Nigeria, Sierra Leone, Tanzania, Togo, and Uganda.
	Grey-headed sunbird	Deleornis axillaris	Mixed forest in the Democratic Republic of the Congo and western Uganda.

The grey-headed sunbird is sometimes considered to be a subspecies of Fraser's sunbird.

The sunbirds are a group of very small Old World passerine birds which feed largely on nectar, although they will also take insects, especially when feeding young. Flight is fast and direct on their short wings. Most species can take nectar by hovering like a hummingbird, but usually perch to feed most of the time.
