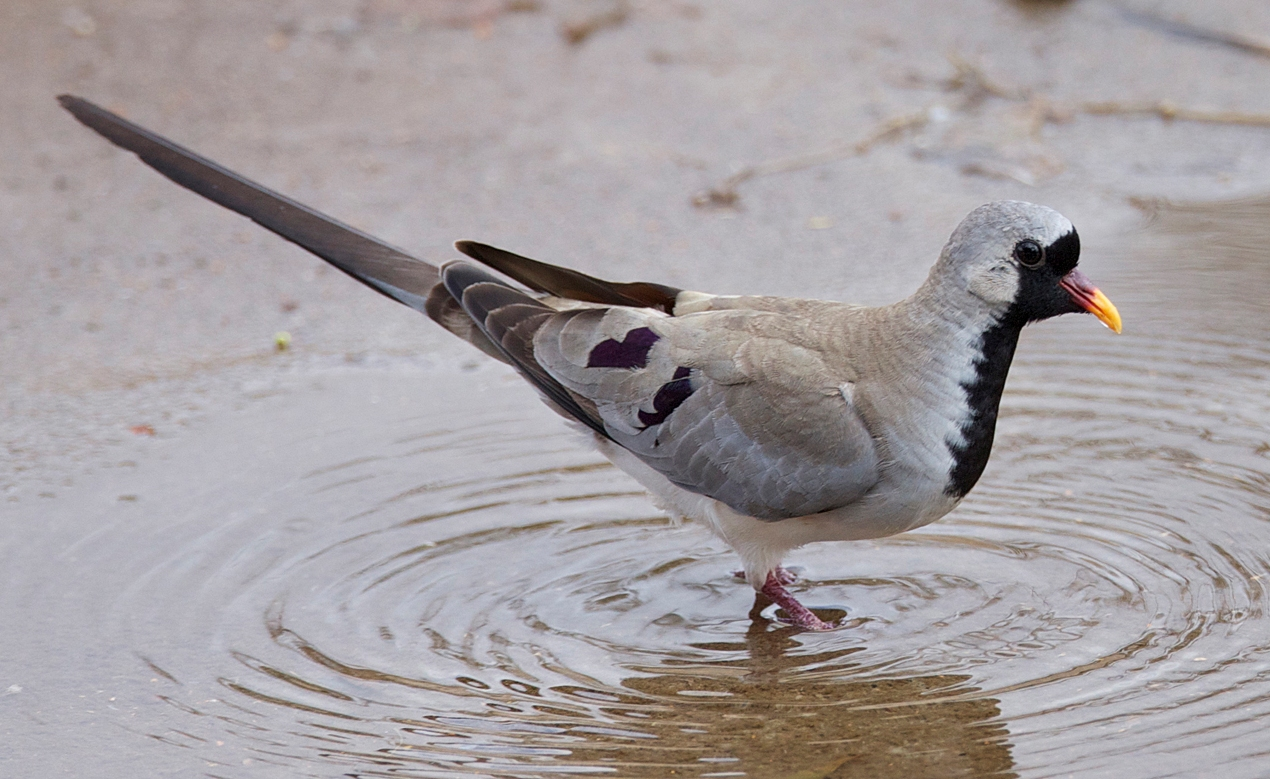

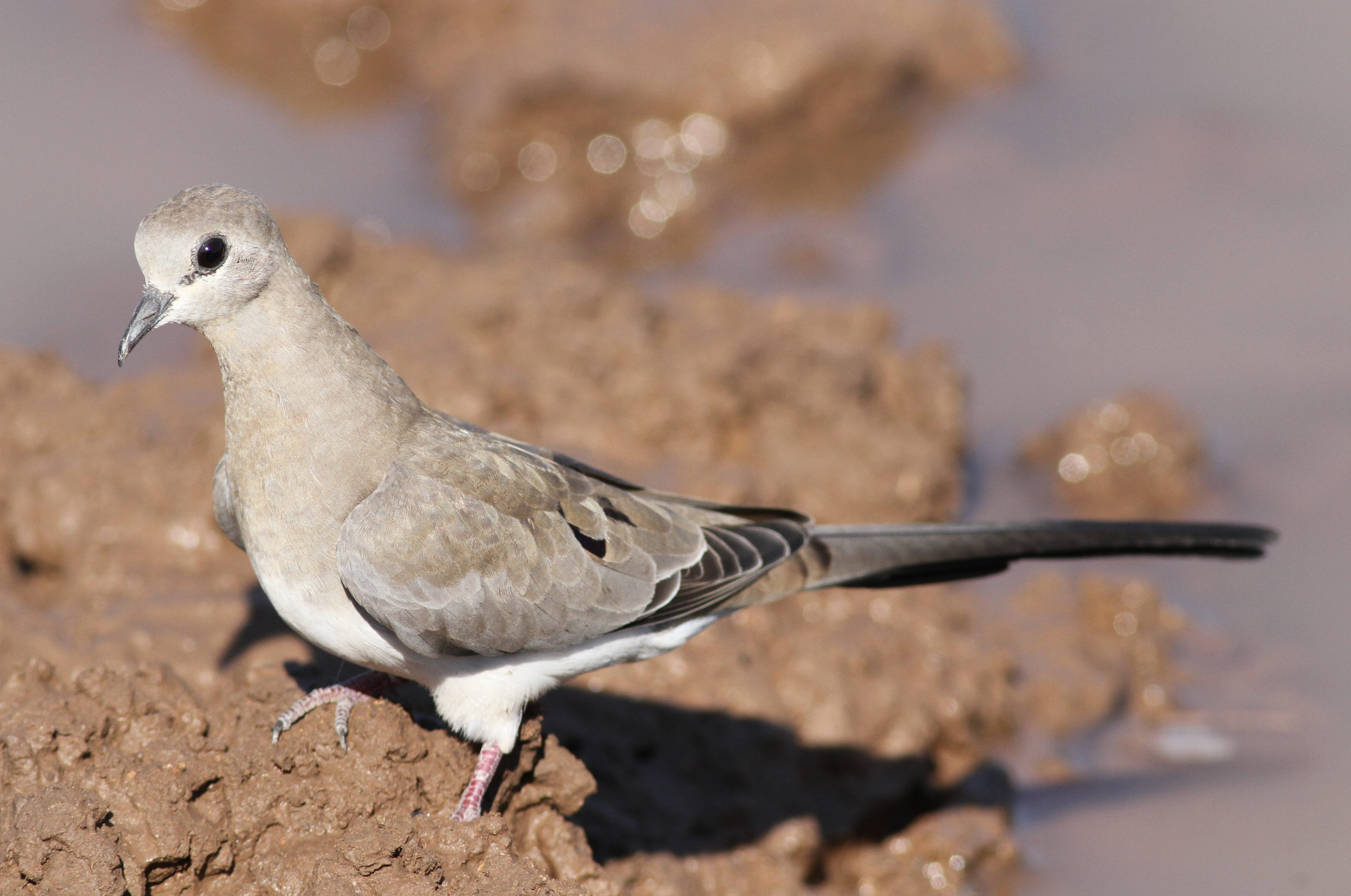
- Adult male at Arusha, Tanzania, and a female at Mapungubwe, South Africa

Conservation status
- Least Concern (IUCN 3.1)

Scientific classification
- Kingdom: Animalia
- Phylum: Chordata
- Class: Aves
- Order: Columbiformes
- Family: Columbidae
- Tribe: Chalcophabini
- Genus: Oena; Swainson, 1837
- Species: O. capensis

Binomial name
- Oena capensis (Linnaeus, 1766)

Synonyms
- Columba capensis Linnaeus, 1766

= Namaqua dove =

Species of bird

The Namaqua dove (Oena capensis) is a very small species of pigeon. It is the only species in the genus Oena. It is found over much of Sub-Saharan Africa as well as Arabia and Madagascar.

== Taxonomy ==
The Namaqua dove is the only species in the monotypic genus Oena. It is most closely related to doves in the genus Turtur, and some phylogenetic evidence suggests that Oena may be a part of Turtur.

In 1760 the French zoologist Mathurin Jacques Brisson included a description of the Namaqua dove in his six volume Ornithologie based on a specimen collected near the Cape of Good Hope in South Africa. He used the French name La tourterelle du Cap de Bonne Espérance and the Latin Turtur capitis bonae spei. Although Brisson coined Latin names, these do not conform to the binomial system and are not recognised by the International Commission on Zoological Nomenclature. When in 1766 the Swedish naturalist Carl Linnaeus updated his Systema Naturae for the twelfth edition, he added 240 species that had been previously described by Brisson. One of these was the Namaqua dove which he placed with the other pigeons in the genus Columba. Linnaeus included a brief description, coined the binomial name Columba capensis and cited Brisson's work. The specific name capensis denotes the Cape of Good Hope.

The Namaqua dove is placed in its own genus Oena that was introduced by the English naturalist William Swainson in 1837. The genus name is from the Ancient Greek oinas meaning "pigeon". Alternative names for the Namaqua dove include Cape dove and long-tailed dove.

=== Subspecies ===
Two subspecies are recognised:

- O. c. capensis Linnaeus, 1766: The nominate subspecies, it is found in sub-Saharan Africa, the Arabian Peninsula, southern Israel, southwestern Jordan, and on Socotra.
- O. c. aliena Bangs, 1918: Found on Madagascar. Males have darker crowns and upperparts, whiter necks and breasts, narrower black foreheads and face-bands, and pale grey undertail coverts. Both sexes have rounder-tipped rectrices and tend to be smaller than the nominate.

== Description ==
The Namaqua dove is a tiny pigeon, typically 22 cm in length with a 28–33 cm wingspan, and weighing 40g. It has a very long black tapered tail, and the size and shape have led to comparison with the budgerigar. The plumage is mostly grey apart from a white belly, and chestnut primary feathers which are visible in flight.

The adult male has a yellow and red beak and a black face, throat and breast. The adult female lacks the black and has a red-based grey bill. Young birds are dark blotched on the wings and shoulders, and otherwise resemble the females.

The song is a quiet, short, double hoo, higher on the longer second note kuh-whooo, mournful and frequently repeated.

== Distribution and habitat ==
The dove is a widespread resident breeding bird in Sub-Saharan Africa and Madagascar with its range extending into the Arabian Peninsula southern Israel and Jordan. It is found in near desert with acacia and bushes.

The Namaqua dove is prone to wander out its original range, and is now being recorded south Asian countries. In Pakistan this species is recorded near shore waters off Paradise Point, Karachi on 14 October 2016. In India, the first and second records were in Gujarat in 2018 and 2020; subsequently the species has been observed multiple times around Nal Sarovar Bird Sanctuary in Gujarat.

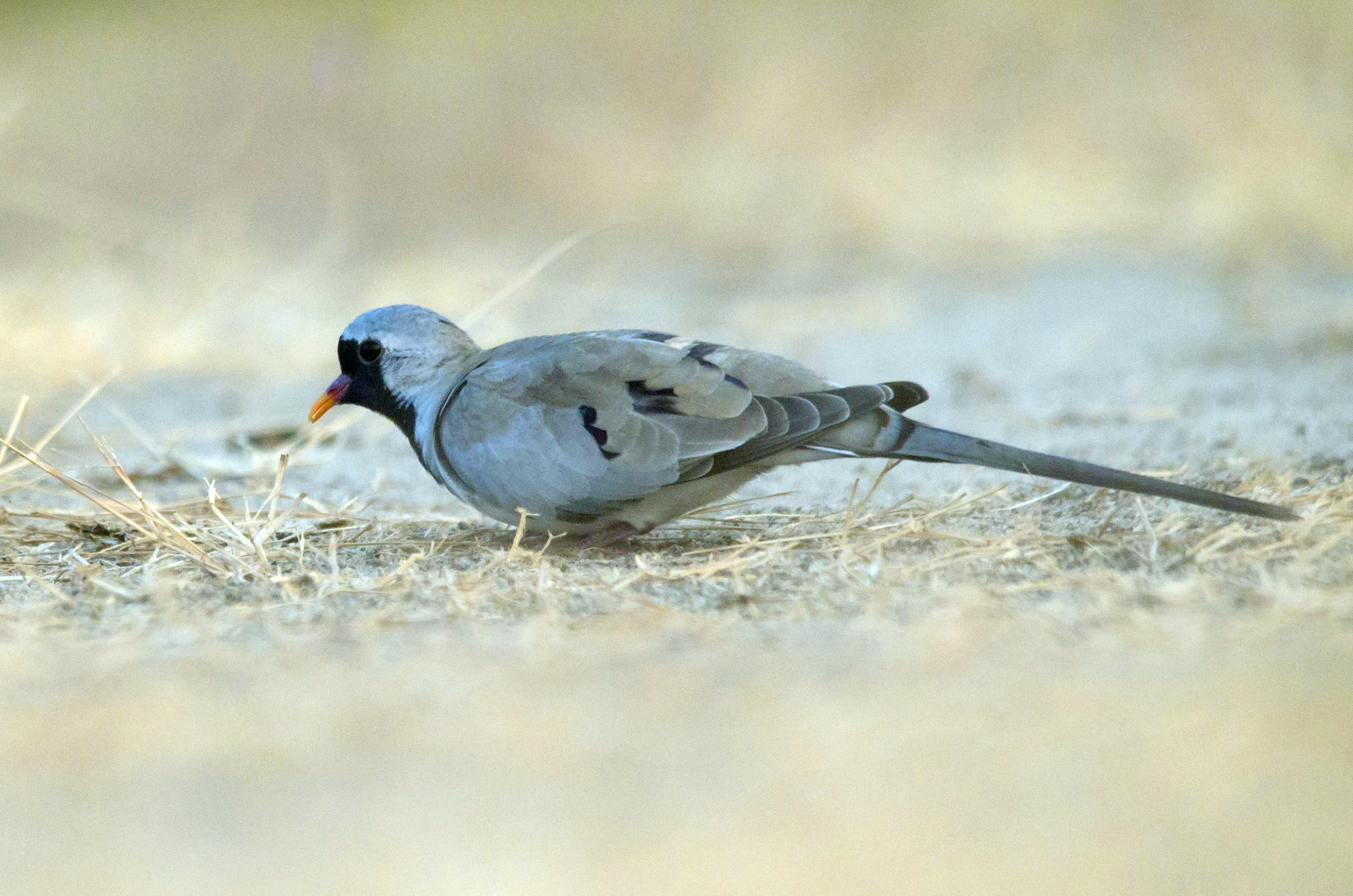
A male Namaqua dove foraging at Nal Sarovar Bird Sanctuary in India

== Behaviour ==
The Namaqua dove is quite terrestrial, and usually forages on open ground and roadsides. The food is almost exclusively minute seeds, such as those of grasses, sedges and weeds. It is not gregarious, being encountered singly or in pairs, though they may form larger flocks at waterholes. The flight is fast with clipped beats and a tendency to stay low.

=== Breeding ===
It builds a stick nest in a bush. It lays two white eggs, which are incubated for 16 days in typical pigeon fashion; the female at night and early morning and the male from mid morning till late afternoon.

== Gallery ==
At Thumamah, KSA

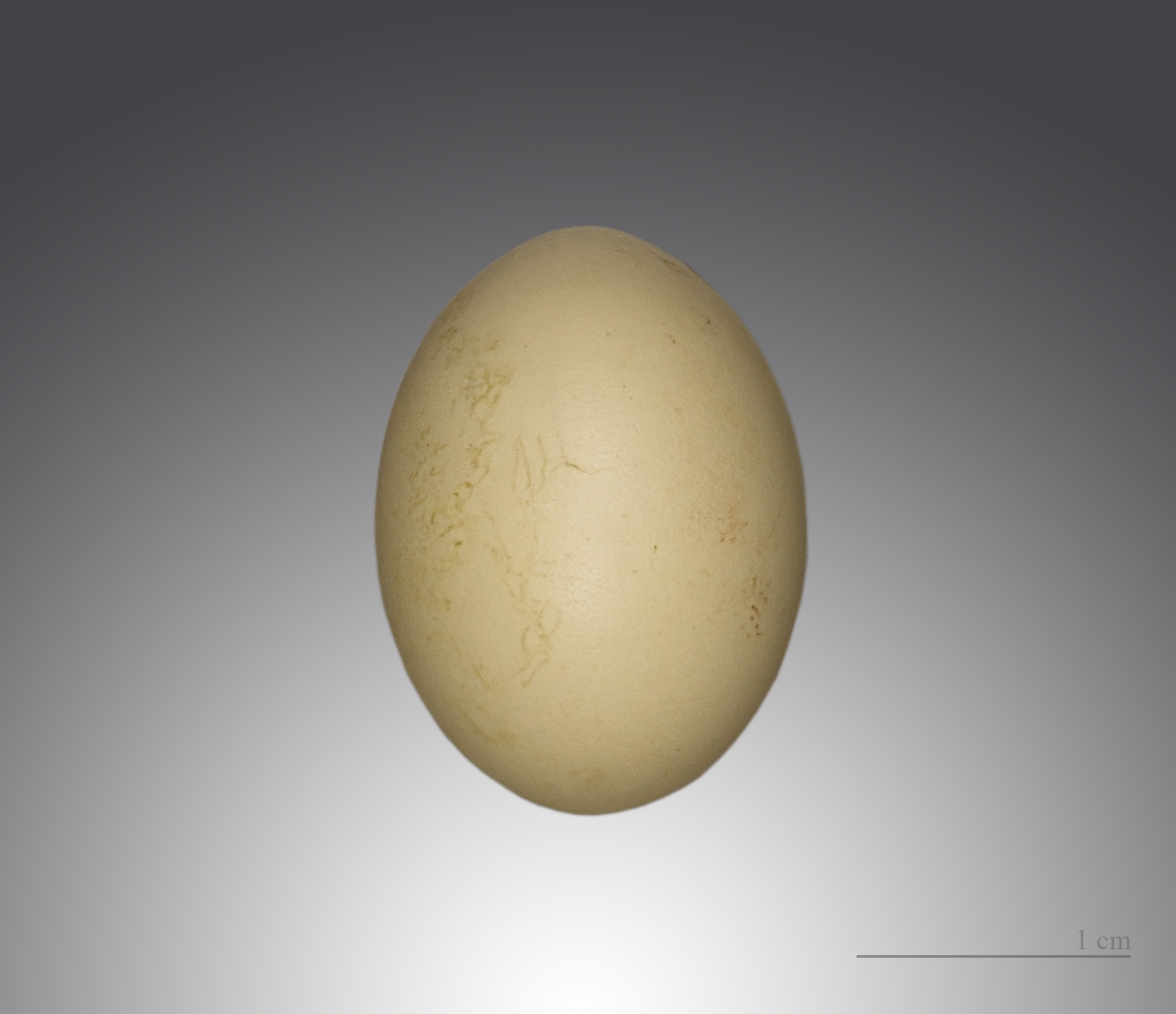
Egg from Atar, Mauritania

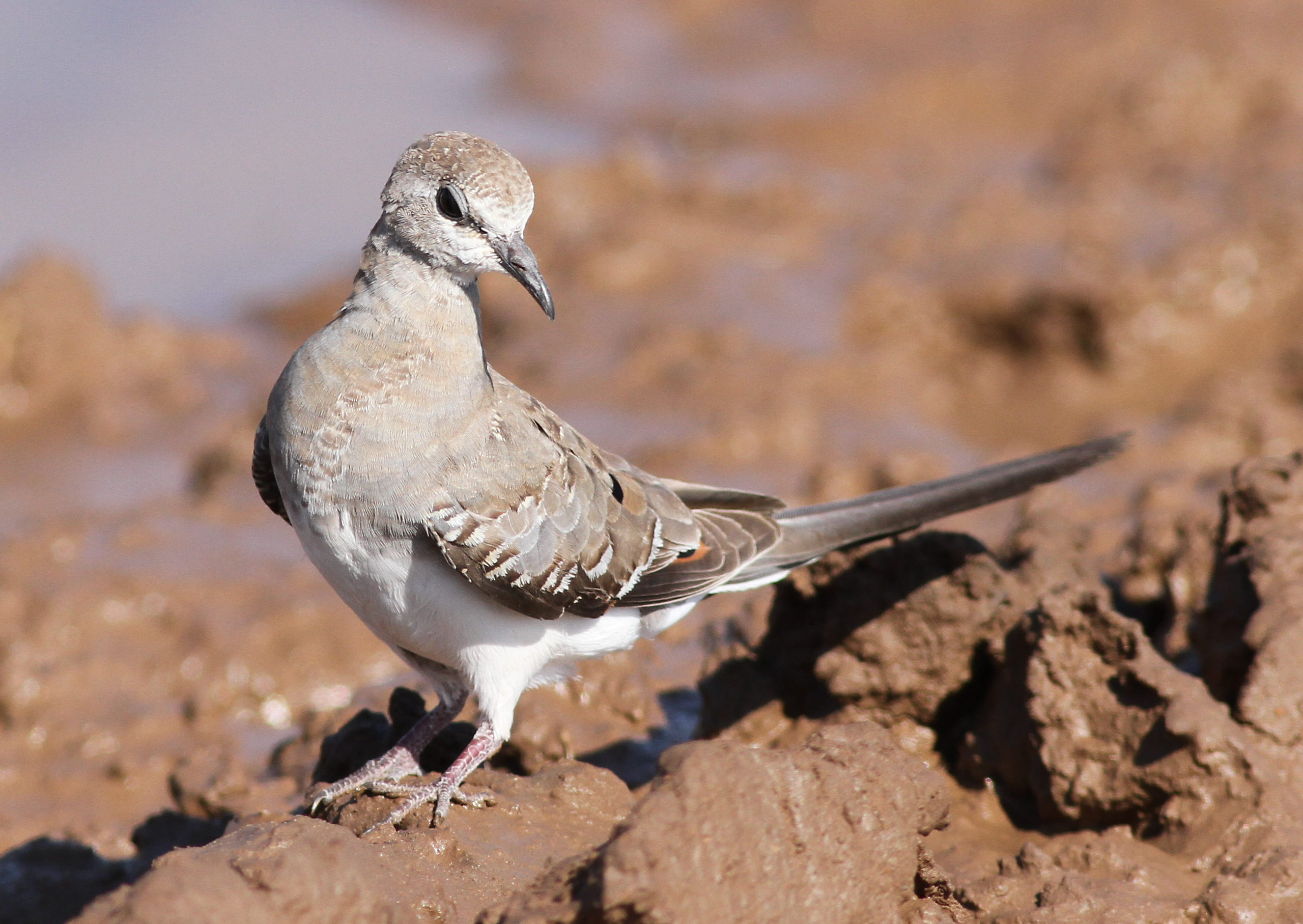
A juvenile bird at Mapungubwe

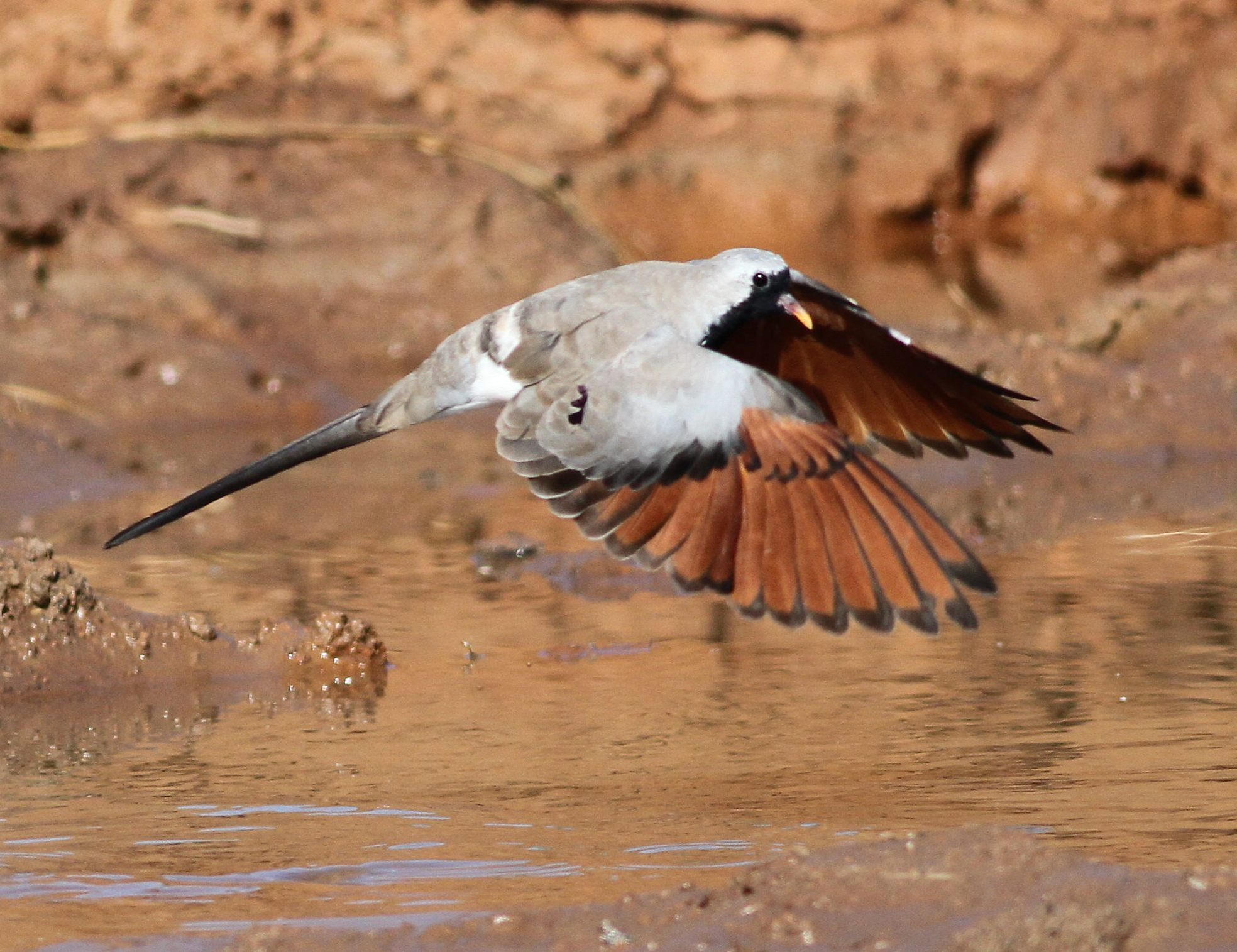
Male in flight at Mapungubwe

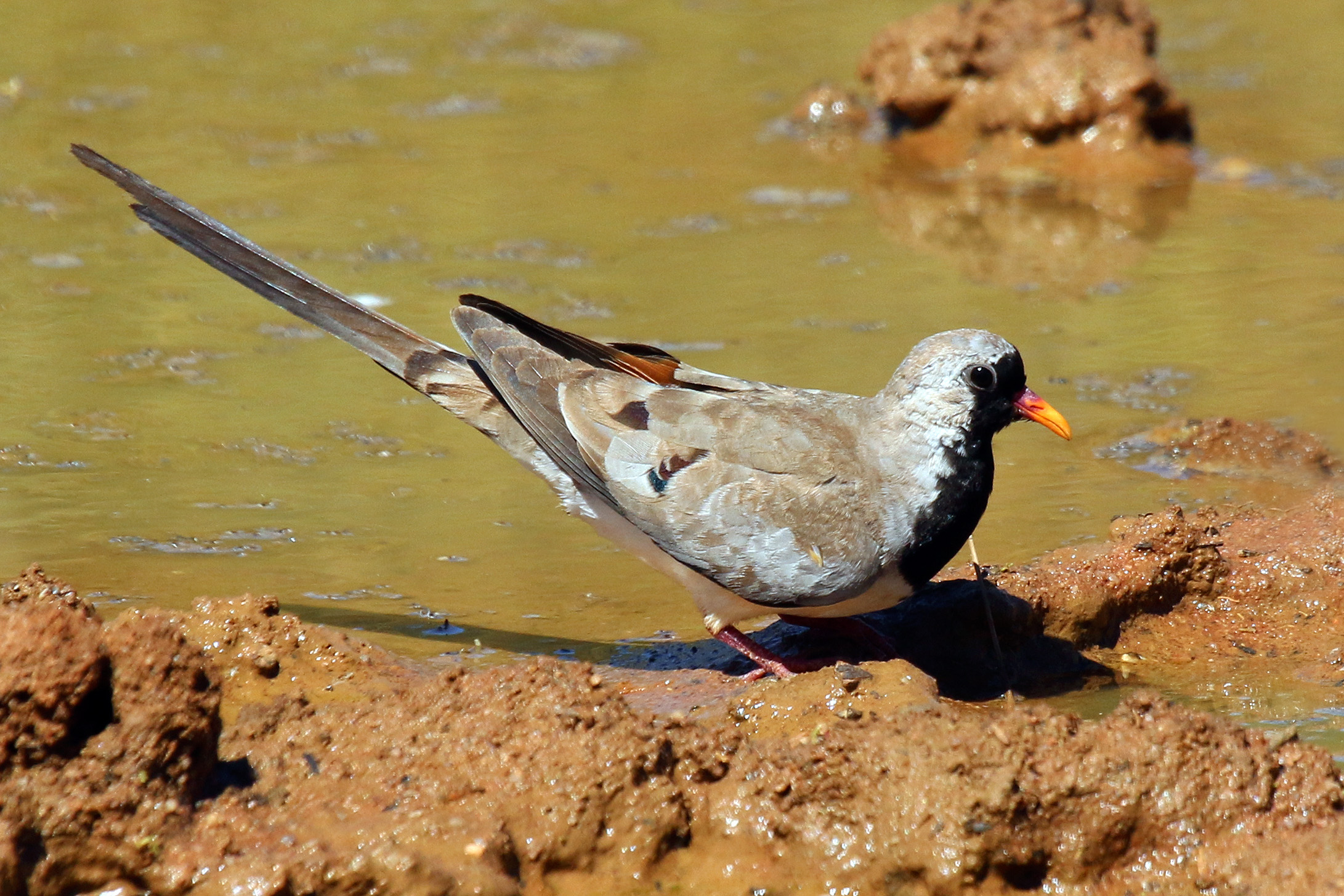
Male at Tswalu Kalahari Reserve, South Africa

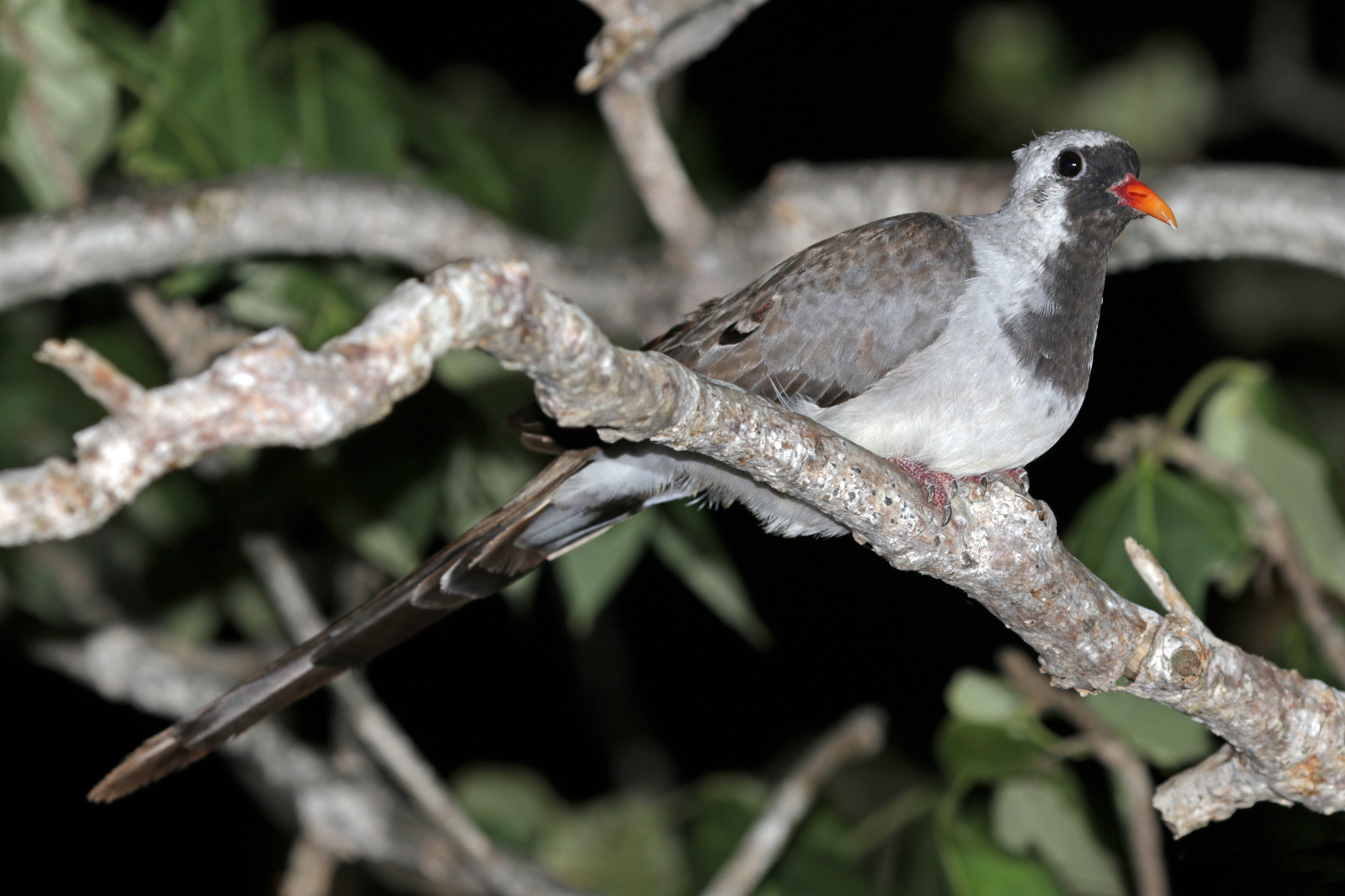
Roosting male O. c. aliena in Madagascar
