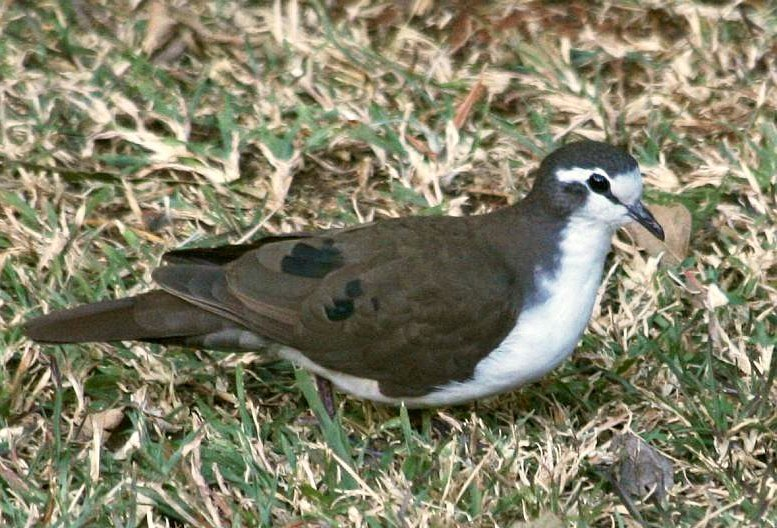

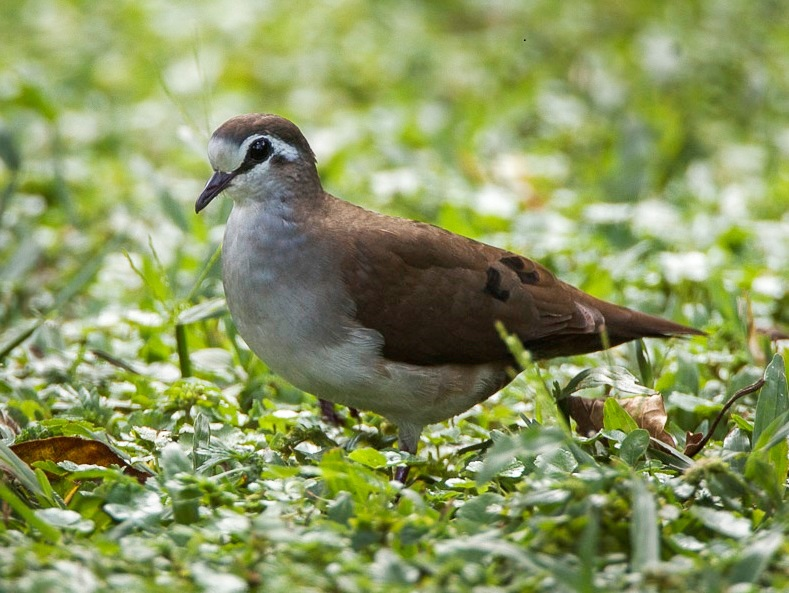
- A male bird in South Africa (above), and a female in Kenya (below)

Conservation status
- Least Concern (IUCN 3.1)

Scientific classification
- Kingdom: Animalia
- Phylum: Chordata
- Class: Aves
- Order: Columbiformes
- Family: Columbidae
- Genus: Turtur
- Species: T. tympanistria

Binomial name
- Turtur tympanistria (Temminck, 1809)

= Tambourine dove =

Species of bird

The tambourine dove (Turtur tympanistria) is a pigeon which is a widespread resident breeding bird in woodlands and other thick vegetation in Africa south of the Sahara Desert. Its range extends from Senegal east to Ethiopia and Kenya and southwards through eastern Africa to south-eastern South Africa, but it is absent from the drier areas of south-western Africa. There is a population on the Comoros Islands.

This is very much a species of thick woodlands, including dense gardens and plantations of castor oil, cocoa and rubber. As such, this shy species is usually seen when flushed whilst feeding on the forest floor. The tambourine dove builds a frail stick nest low in a thicket or vine tangle, and lays two cream-coloured eggs. Both sexes incubate, although this task is performed mainly by the female, and the eggs hatch in 13 days with another 13–14 days to fledging. The chicks are fed regurgitated food.

The tambourine dove is a small plump pigeon, typically 22 cm in length. The male has a white face with a black spot behind the eye, white underparts and a grey crown. Its back, hind neck, wings and tail are pale grey brown, and the folded wings have large dark purple patches. The under tail is brown. The eye ring and feet are purple-red, and the bill is purple.

The female is duller, and is white only on the belly, the face and breast being a pale grey-brown. The crown is grey-brown, without the blue-grey of the male. The juvenile resembles the female but has chestnut fringes to the feathers of the back, breast and flanks. Even in these plumages, this species is paler below than other small African doves.

The tambourine dove's flight is fast and agile, and it tends to stay quite low when flushed. In flight it shows chestnut primary flight feathers and under wings.

The call of this bird is a persistently repeated du-du-du-du-du.

Tambourine dove is usually solitary, but is sometimes seen in family groups or with lemon doves. It is quite terrestrial, and usually forages on the ground for seeds and small fruits. It has a preference for seeds of the castor oil plant. It will on occasion eat small insects and molluscs.
