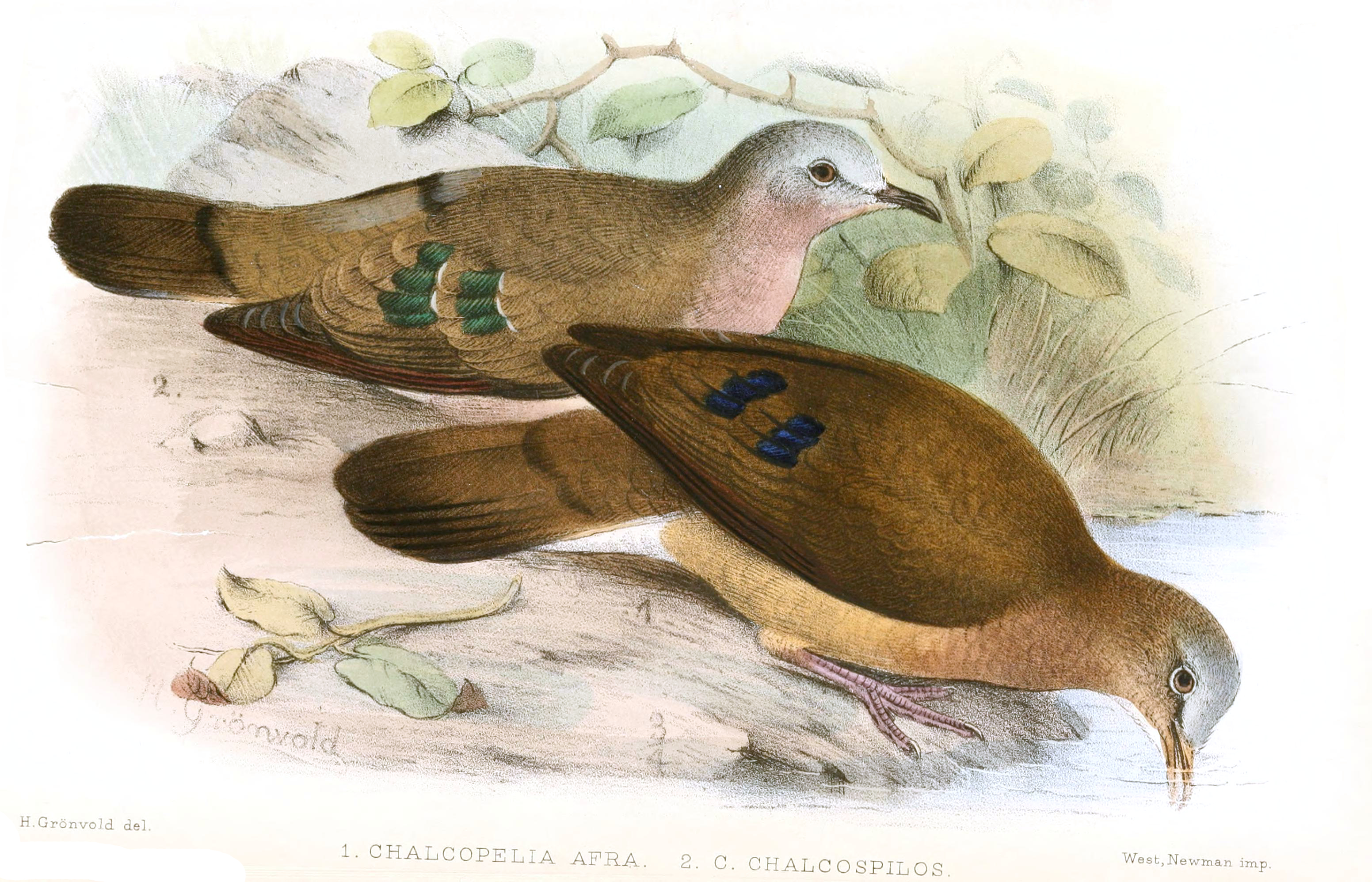
- Turtur chalcospilos (behind) and Turtur afer (front) by Henrik Grönvold

Scientific classification
- Kingdom: Animalia
- Phylum: Chordata
- Class: Aves
- Order: Columbiformes
- Family: Columbidae
- Tribe: Chalcophabini
- Genus: Turtur; Boddaert, 1783

Type species
- Columba afra Linnaeus, 1766

Species
- See text.

= Turtur =

Wood doves

Genus of birds

Turtur is a small genus of doves native to sub-Saharan Africa. Species in this genus are known as wood doves.

The genus Turtur was introduced in 1783 by the Dutch naturalist Pieter Boddaert to accommodate the blue-spotted wood dove (Turtur afer). The word turtur is Latin for "turtle dove".

== Species ==
The genus contains five species:

Image	Scientific name	Common name	Distribution
	Turtur chalcospilos	Emerald-spotted wood dove	eastern and southern Africa
	Turtur abyssinicus	Black-billed wood dove	Africa just south of the Sahara Desert
	Turtur afer	Blue-spotted wood dove	Africa south of the Sahel
	Turtur tympanistria	Tambourine dove	from Senegal east to Ethiopia and Kenya and southwards through eastern Africa to south-eastern South Africa
	Turtur brehmeri	Blue-headed wood dove	African tropical rainforest
