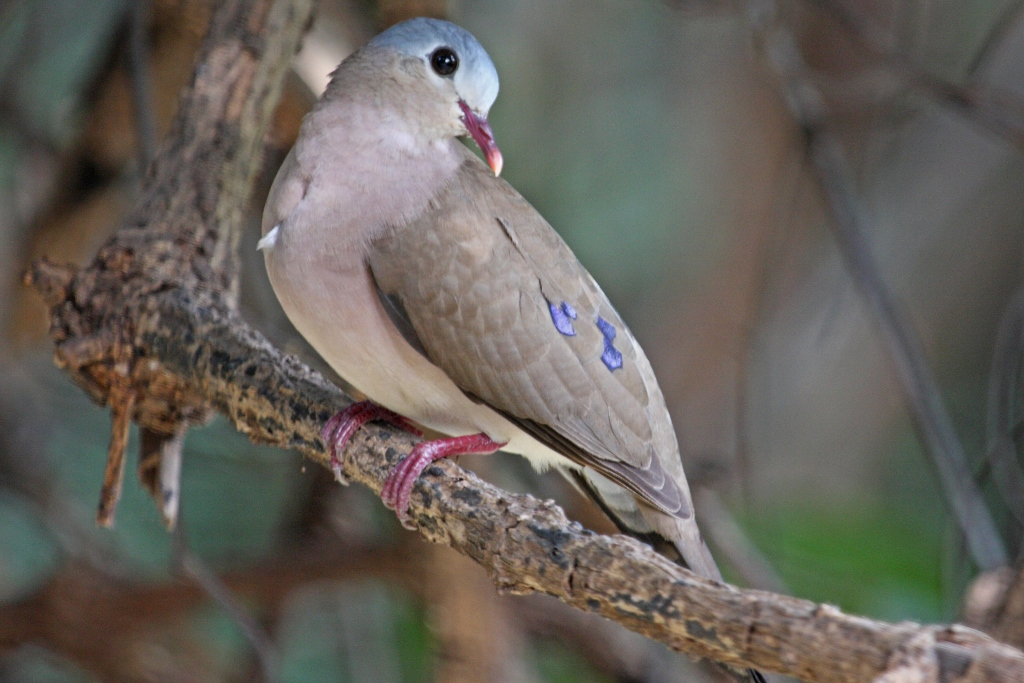
- In Gambia

Conservation status
- Least Concern (IUCN 3.1)

Scientific classification
- Kingdom: Animalia
- Phylum: Chordata
- Class: Aves
- Order: Columbiformes
- Family: Columbidae
- Genus: Turtur
- Species: T. afer

Binomial name
- Turtur afer (Linnaeus, 1766)

Synonyms
- Columba afra Linnaeus, 1766

= Blue-spotted wood dove =

Species of bird

The blue-spotted wood dove or blue-spotted dove (Turtur afer) is a species of bird in the family Columbidae. It is abundantly present throughout Africa south of the Sahel; it is partially present in East Africa and absent in southern Africa.

== Taxonomy ==
In 1760 the French zoologist Mathurin Jacques Brisson included a description of the blue-spotted wood dove in his six volume Ornithologie based on a specimen collected in Senegal. He used the French name La tourterelle de Sénégal and the Latin Turtur senegalensis. Although Brisson coined Latin names, these do not conform to the binomial system and are not recognised by the International Commission on Zoological Nomenclature. When in 1766 the Swedish naturalist Carl Linnaeus updated his Systema Naturae for the twelfth edition, he added 240 species that had been previously described by Brisson. One of these was the blue-spotted wood dove which he placed with all the other pigeons in the genus Columba. Linnaeus included a brief description, coined the binomial name Columba afra and cited Brisson's work. The specific name afer is the Latin word for "Africa". The species is now placed in the genus Turtur that was introduced in 1783 by the Dutch naturalist Pieter Boddaert. The species is monotypic: no subspecies are recognised.
