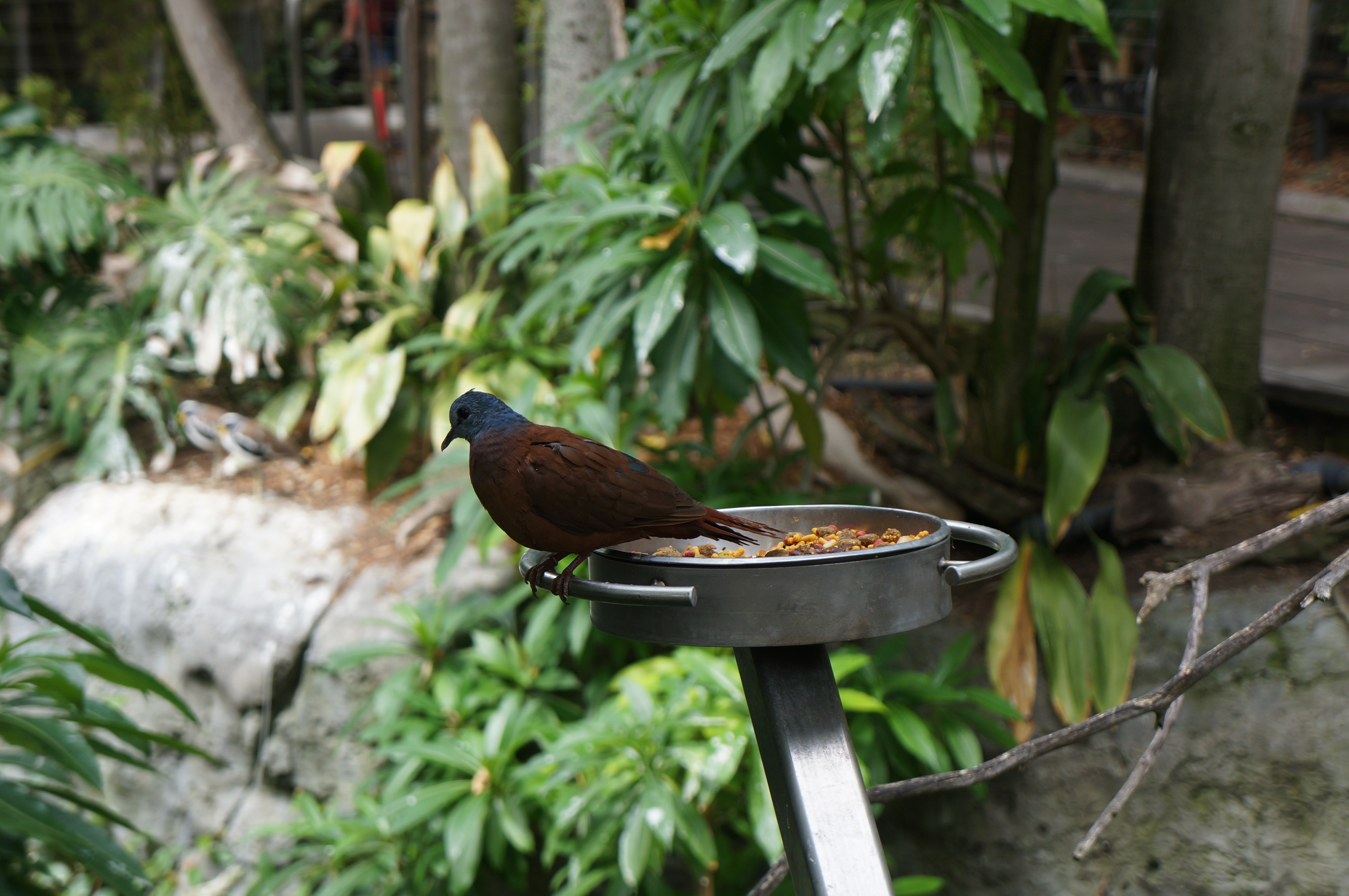

Conservation status
- Least Concern (IUCN 3.1)

Scientific classification
- Kingdom: Animalia
- Phylum: Chordata
- Class: Aves
- Order: Columbiformes
- Family: Columbidae
- Genus: Turtur
- Species: T. brehmeri

Binomial name
- Turtur brehmeri (Hartlaub, 1865)

= Blue-headed wood dove =

Species of bird

The blue-headed wood dove (Turtur brehmeri), also known as the blue-headed dove, is a medium-sized (up to 25 cm (9.8 in) long), rufous brown wood-dove with bluish-grey head, iridescent green patches on wings, reddish bill, dark brown iris, and dark red feet. Both sexes are similar. The young is duller in colour than adult.

The blue-headed wood dove is widespread across the African tropical rainforest.

The blue-headed wood dove nests in trees. The nest is made from twigs, leaves, and other vegetation. Its diet consists mainly of seeds, fallen fruits, insects, and small animals taken from feeding grounds. The female usually lays one to two eggs.

Widespread and locally common throughout its large range, the blue-headed wood dove is evaluated as of least concern on the IUCN Red List of Threatened Species.
