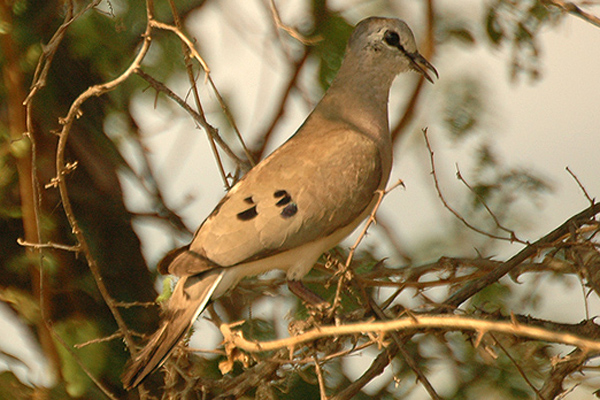

Conservation status
- Least Concern (IUCN 3.1)

Scientific classification
- Kingdom: Animalia
- Phylum: Chordata
- Class: Aves
- Order: Columbiformes
- Family: Columbidae
- Genus: Turtur
- Species: T. abyssinicus

Binomial name
- Turtur abyssinicus (Sharpe, 1902)

= Black-billed wood dove =

Species of bird

The black-billed wood dove or black-billed dove (Turtur abyssinicus) is a pigeon which is a widespread resident breeding bird in a belt across Africa just south of the Sahara Desert.

This species is abundant in near desert, scrub and savannah. It builds a stick nest in a tree, often an acacia, and lays two cream-colored eggs. Its flight is quick, with the regular beats and an occasional sharp flick of the wings which are characteristic of pigeons in general, and it tends to stay quite low.

Black-billed wood dove is a small plump pigeon, typically 20 cm in length. Its back, hindneck, wings and tail are pale grey brown, and the folded wings have dark metallic patches. There are two blackish bands on the back. The forehead, crown and nape are bluish grey, fading to whitish on the face. The underparts are pinkish, becoming whiter on the belly.

The bill of this dove is black. When flying, black-billed wood dove shows chestnut in the underwing. The call is a persistent fluted coo-coo-cu-coo. Sexes are similar, but immatures are duller than adults, scaly below, and lack the wing spots.

Black-billed wood doves eat grass and other small seeds. They are quite terrestrial, and usually forage on the ground.

They are not very gregarious, but form large flocks at waterholes.

Though they are classified as Least Concern in the IUCN, their population has decreased significantly since 2004.
