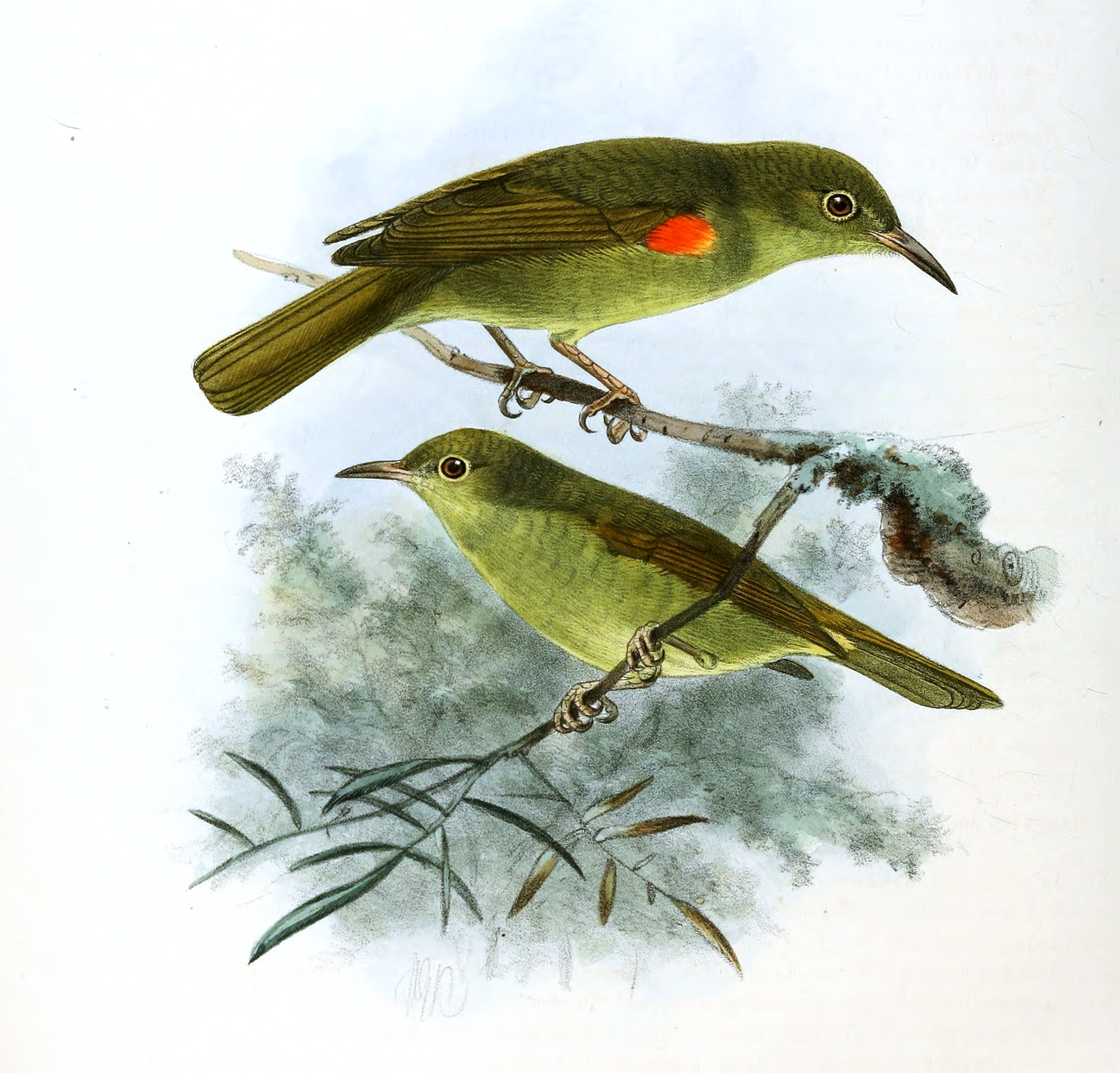
- by Keulemans
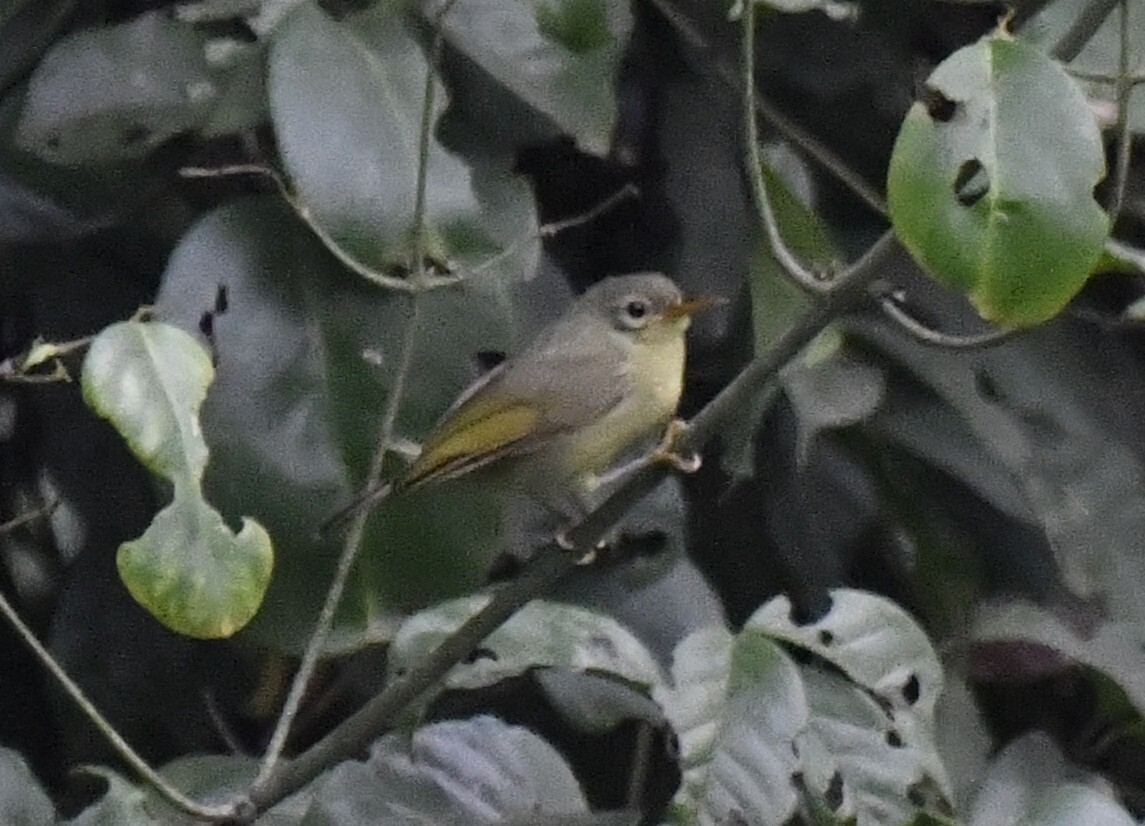

Conservation status
- Least Concern (IUCN 3.1)

Scientific classification
- Kingdom: Animalia
- Phylum: Chordata
- Class: Aves
- Order: Passeriformes
- Family: Nectariniidae
- Genus: Deleornis
- Species: D. fraseri

Binomial name
- Deleornis fraseri (Jardine & Selby, 1843)

Synonyms
- Anthreptes fraseri

= Fraser's sunbird =

Species of bird

Fraser's sunbird (Deleornis fraseri) or the scarlet-tufted sunbird, is a species of bird in the family Nectariniidae. It is found in Angola, Cameroon, Central African Republic, Republic of the Congo, Democratic Republic of the Congo, Ivory Coast, Equatorial Guinea, Gabon, Ghana, Guinea, Liberia, Mali, Nigeria, Sierra Leone, Tanzania, Togo, and Uganda.
