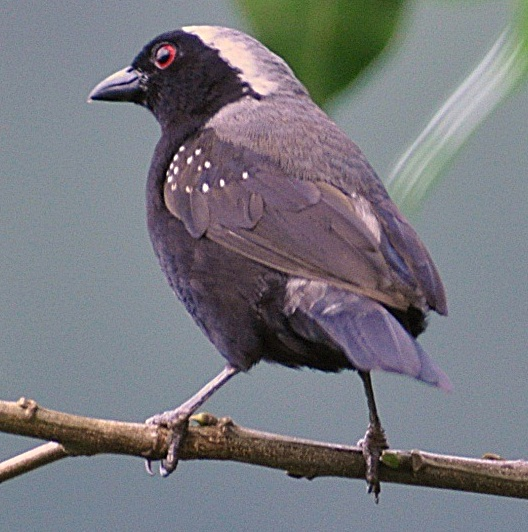
- Grey-headed nigrita (N. canicapillus)

Scientific classification
- Kingdom: Animalia
- Phylum: Chordata
- Class: Aves
- Order: Passeriformes
- Family: Estrildidae
- Genus: Nigrita; Strickland, 1843

Type species
- Aethiops canicapillus Strickland, 1841

Species
- N. fusconotus; N. bicolor; N. luteifrons; N. canicapillus

= Nigrita (bird) =

Genus of birds

The nigritas, formerly called negrofinches, are small passerine birds belonging to the genus Nigrita in the estrildid finch family Estrildidae. There are four species which occur across the African tropical rainforest.

They are 10–15 cm (3.9–5.9 in) long. The bill is short and black and is fairly slender in some species. The colour of the plumage varies but all have a dark tail. The upperparts are grey or brown and the underparts are black, grey, white or reddish brown. The grey-headed nigrita and male pale-fronted nigrita have a black face and the white-breasted nigrita has a black cap. Nigritas have whistling or trilling songs and calls.

They feed on insects, fruit and seeds. They often forage high in the treetops, usually alone or in pairs.

== Taxonomy ==
The genus Negrita was introduced in 1843 by the English naturalist Hugh Edwin Strickland as a replacement name for Aethiops. Strickland had introduced the genus Aethiops in 1841 in the combination Aethiops canicapillus for the grey-headed nigrita. The name Aethiops was pre-occupied as it had been used earlier in 1841 by William Martin for a genus of monkeys. The type species is Aethiops canicapillus Strickland, by monotypy. The genus name Negrita is from Modern Latin negritus meaning "black".

== Species list ==
The genus contains the following four species:

Image	Scientific name	Common name	Distribution
	Nigrita fusconotus	White-breasted nigrita	widespread
	Nigrita bicolor	Chestnut-breasted nigrita	widespread
	Nigrita luteifrons	Pale-fronted nigrita	widespread
	Nigrita canicapillus	Grey-headed nigrita	widespread
