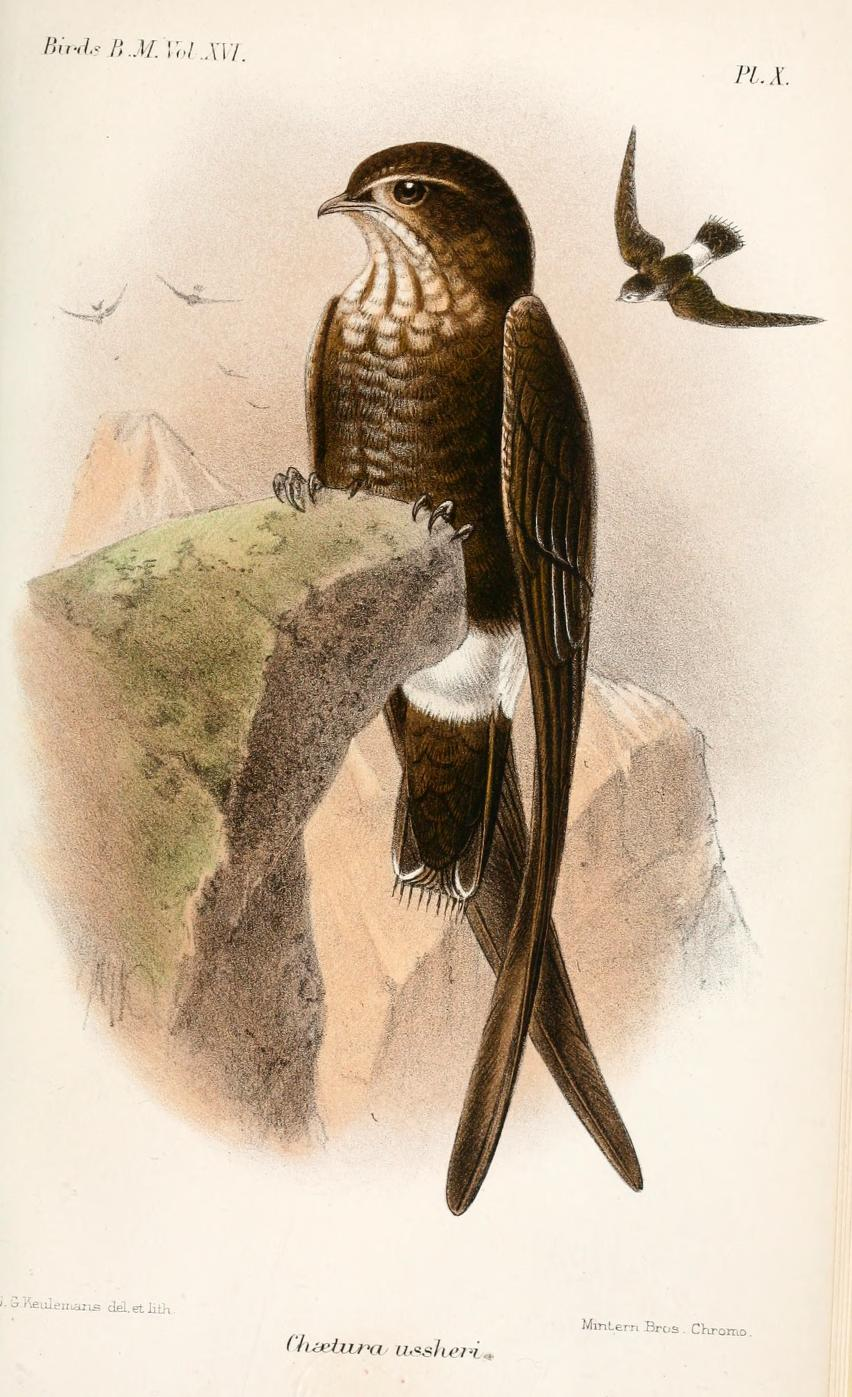

Conservation status
- Least Concern (IUCN 3.1)

Scientific classification
- Kingdom: Animalia
- Phylum: Chordata
- Class: Aves
- Order: Apodiformes
- Family: Apodidae
- Genus: Telacanthura
- Species: T. ussheri

Binomial name
- Telacanthura ussheri (Sharpe, 1870)

= Mottled spinetail =

Species of bird

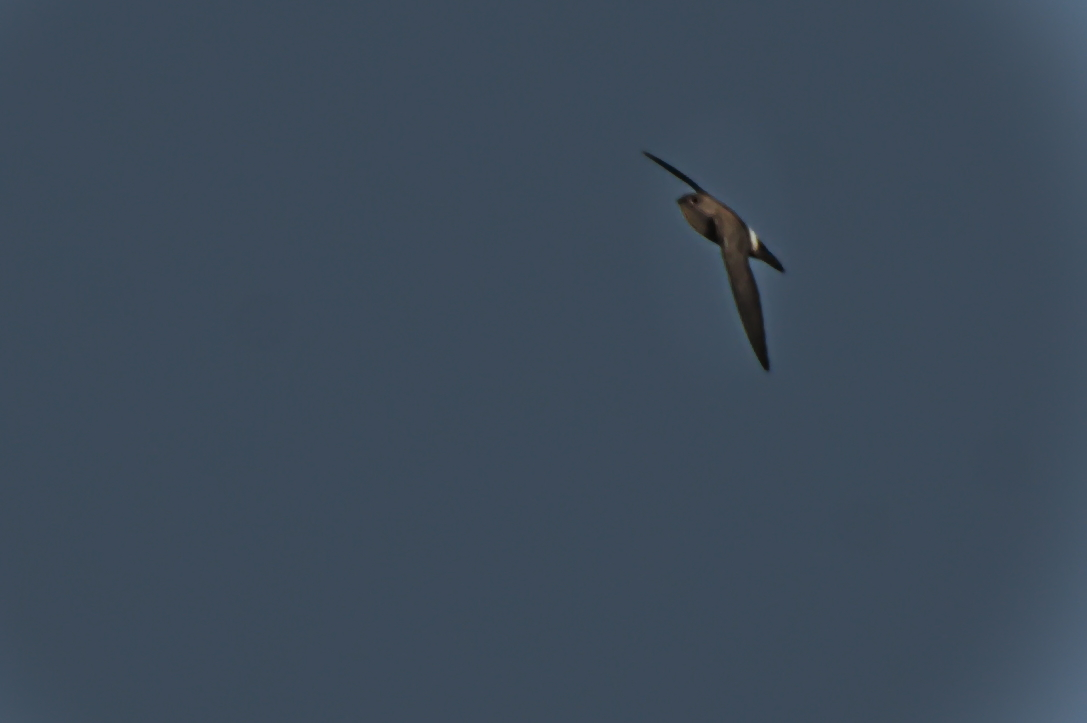
Mottled Spinetail

The mottled spinetail (Telacanthura ussheri) is a species of swift in the family Apodidae. It is found in Angola, Benin, Burkina Faso, Cameroon, Central African Republic, Republic of the Congo, Democratic Republic of the Congo, Ivory Coast, Equatorial Guinea, Gabon, Gambia, Ghana, Guinea, Guinea-Bissau, Kenya, Liberia, Malawi, Mali, Mozambique, Niger, Nigeria, Senegal, Sierra Leone, Somalia, South Africa, Tanzania, Togo, Uganda, Zambia, and Zimbabwe.

== Taxonomy ==
The mottled spinetail was formally described in 1870 by the English ornithologist Richard Bowdler Sharpe based on a specimen collected near Fort Victoria, Cape Coast, in present-day Ghana, by the British colonial administrator Herbert Taylor Ussher. Ussher would later become Governor of the Gold Coast. Sharpe coined the binomial name Chaetura ussheri where the specific epithet was named after the collector. The mottled spinetail is now placed together with the black spinetail in the genus Telacanthura that was introduced in 1918 by the Australian-born ornithologist Gregory Mathews.

Four subspecies are recognised:

- T. u. ussheri (Sharpe, 1870) – Senegal and Gambia to Nigeria
- T. u. sharpei (Neumann, 1908) – Cameroon and Gabon through DR Congo to Uganda
- T. u. stictilaema (Reichenow, 1879) – south Kenya and northeast, central Tanzania
- T. u. benguellensis (Neumann, 1908) – west Angola to Mozambique
