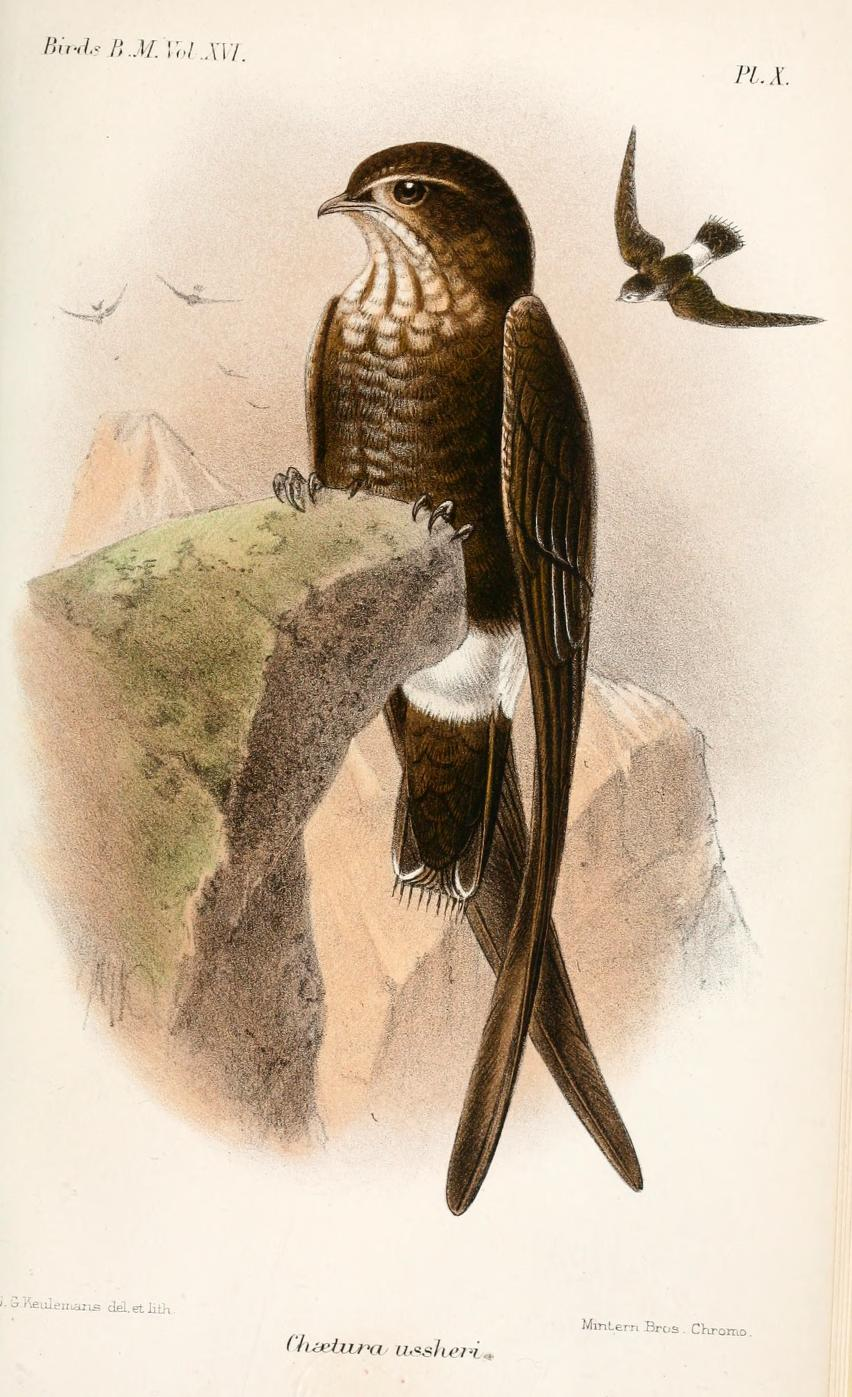
- Mottled spinetail (Telacanthura ussheri)

Scientific classification
- Kingdom: Animalia
- Phylum: Chordata
- Class: Aves
- Order: Apodiformes
- Family: Apodidae
- Tribe: Chaeturini
- Genus: Telacanthura; Mathews, 1918

Type species
- Chaetura ussheri Sharpe, 1870

= Telacanthura =

Genus of birds

Telacanthura is a genus containing two species of swift in the family Apodidae that are found in Africa.

== Taxonomy ==
The genus Telacanthura was introduced in 1918 by the Australian-born ornithologist Gregory Mathews with the type species as Chaetura ussheri Sharpe, 1870, the mottled spinetail. The genus name is from Ancient Greek τελος/telos meaning "accomplished" or "end" with ακανθα/akantha meaning "thorn".

The genus contains two species:

- Black spinetail (Telacanthura melanopygia)
- Mottled spinetail (Telacanthura ussheri)
