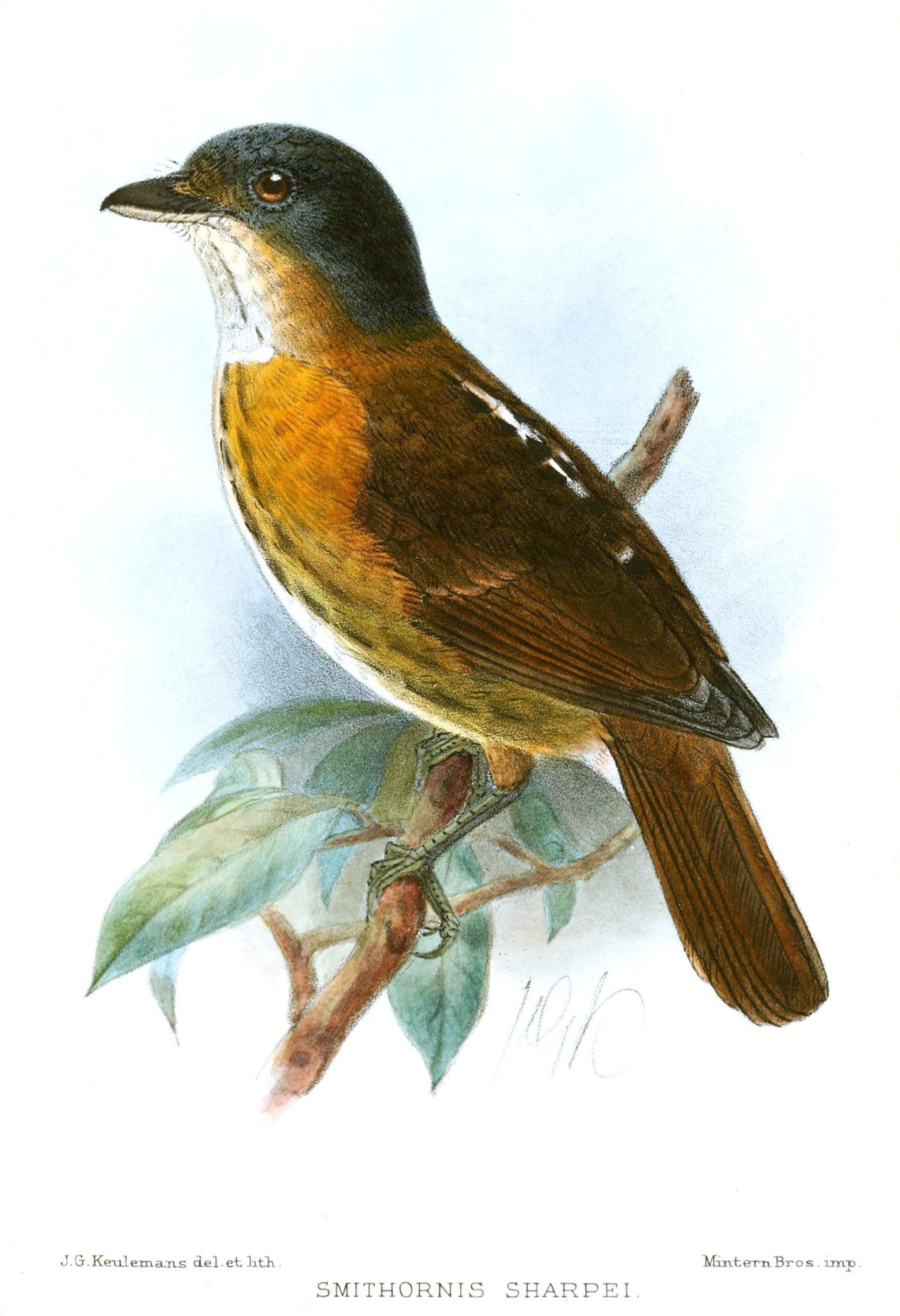

Conservation status
- Least Concern (IUCN 3.1)

Scientific classification
- Kingdom: Animalia
- Phylum: Chordata
- Class: Aves
- Order: Passeriformes
- Family: Calyptomenidae
- Genus: Smithornis
- Species: S. sharpei

Binomial name
- Smithornis sharpei Alexander, 1903

= Grey-headed broadbill =

Species of bird

The grey-headed broadbill (Smithornis sharpei) is a species of bird in the family Calyptomenidae. It is found in Cameroon, Central African Republic, Republic of the Congo, Democratic Republic of the Congo, Equatorial Guinea, Gabon, and Nigeria. Its natural habitat is subtropical or tropical moist lowland forests.

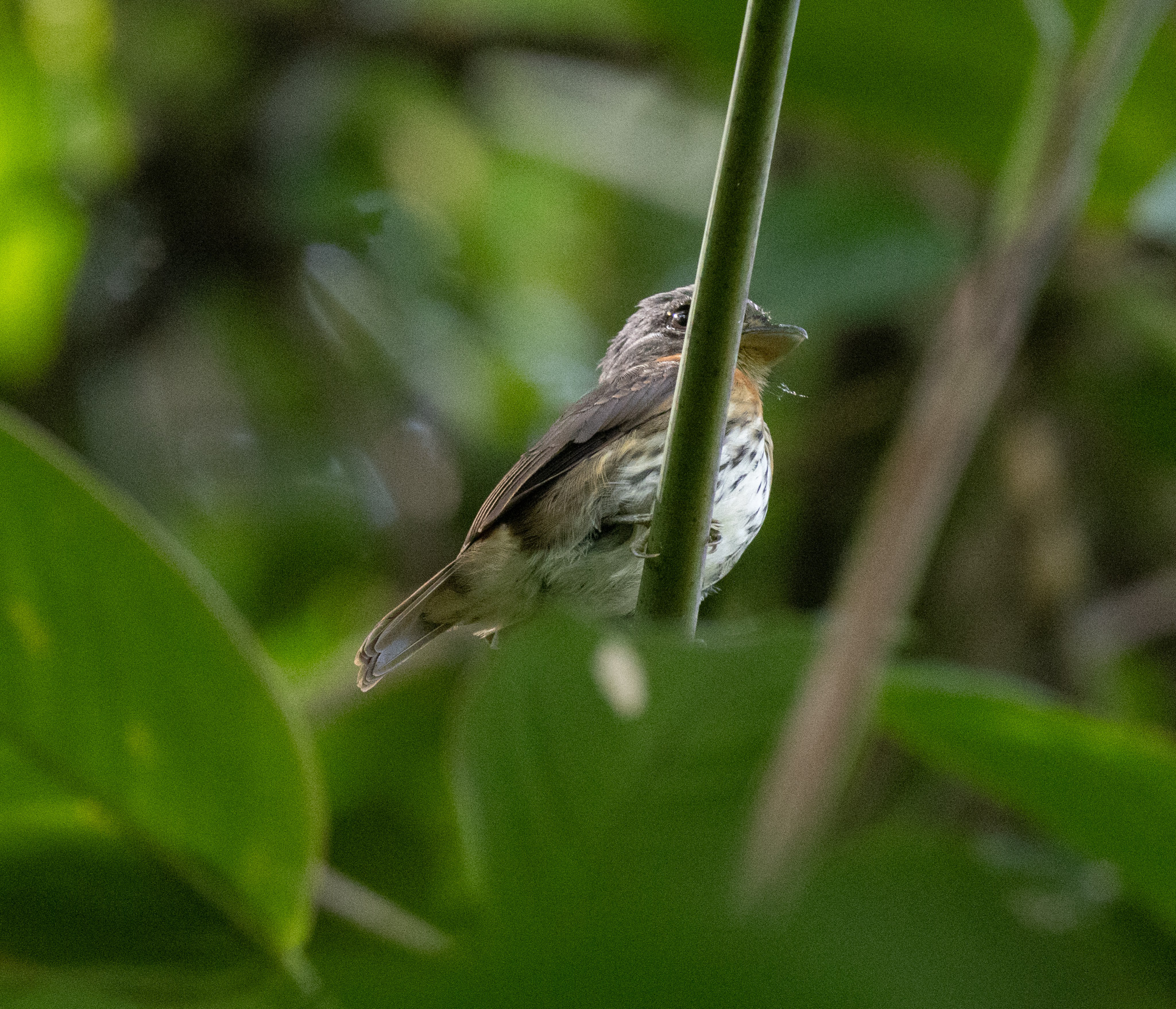
In Cameroon
