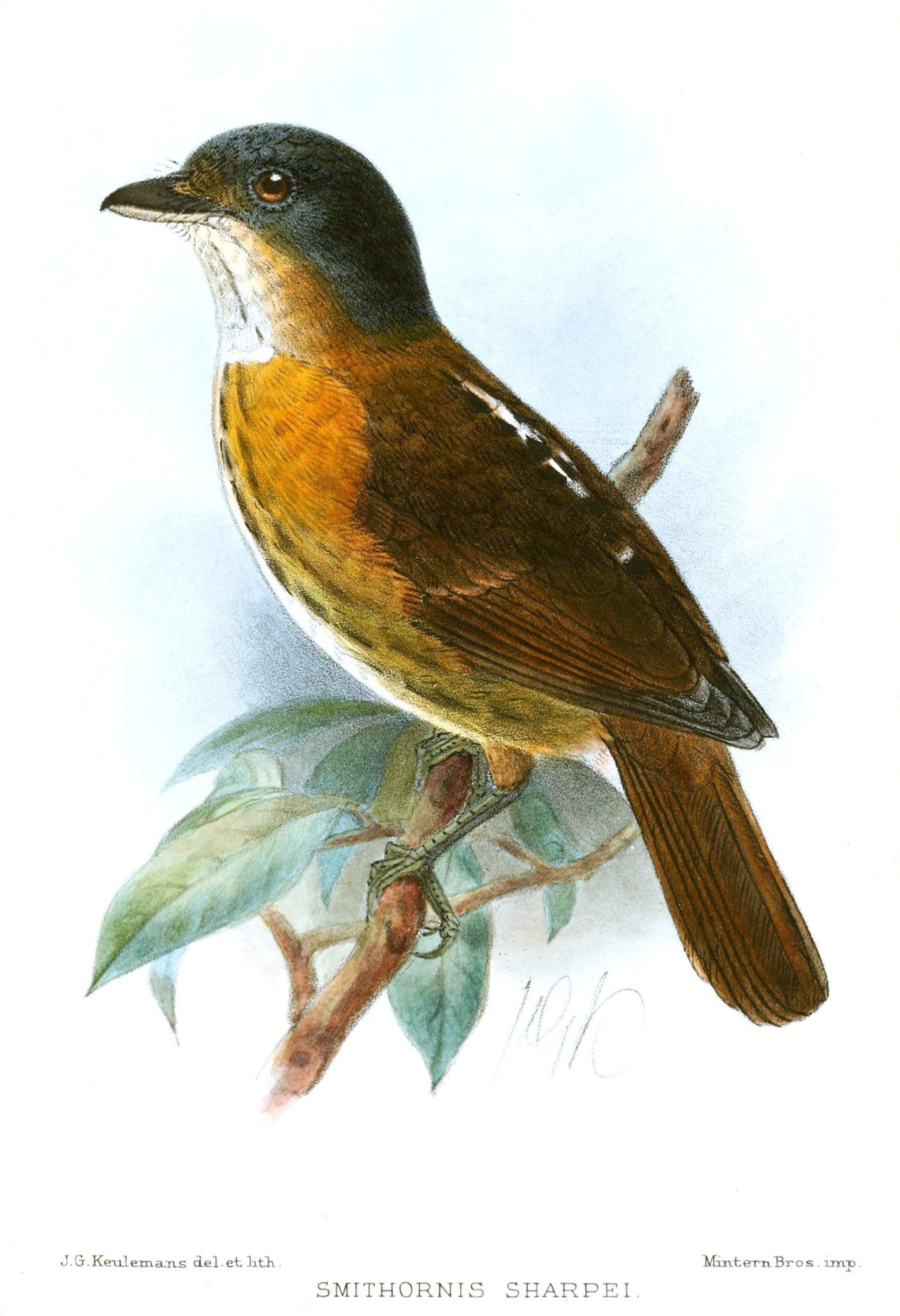
- Grey-headed broadbill (Smithornis sharpei)

Scientific classification
- Kingdom: Animalia
- Phylum: Chordata
- Class: Aves
- Order: Passeriformes
- Family: Calyptomenidae
- Genus: Smithornis; Bonaparte, 1850

Type species
- Platyrhynchus capensis A. Smith, 1839

Species
- see Text

= Smithornis =

Genus of birds

Smithornis is a genus of birds in the family Calyptomenidae, the broadbills. The genus comprises three species native to Africa.

Before 1914 this genus was classified in the Old World flycatcher family, Muscicapidae, due to certain similarities. Closer examination of the morphology and anatomical features of these birds resulted in their being reclassified in the Eurylaimidae.

It is hypothesized that Smithornis is a monophyletic genus, well separated from other birds in the Eurylaimidae. The differentiation occurred as a result of a division and diversification between Asian and African broadbills.

== Species ==
Image	Scientific name	Common name	Distribution
	Smithornis capensis	African broadbill	coastal West Africa from Sierra Leone in the west eastwards to the Central African Republic and south to Gabon and the northern Congo
	Smithornis rufolateralis	Rufous-sided broadbill	Sub-Saharan Africa.
	Smithornis sharpei	Grey-headed broadbill	Cameroon, Central African Republic, Republic of the Congo, Democratic Republic of the Congo, Equatorial Guinea, Gabon, and Nigeria.

== Etymology ==
Smithornis: Sir Andrew Smith (1797–1872), Scottish surgeon, zoologist, ethnologist, explorer in South Africa; Greek: ορνις ornis, ορνιθος ornithos "bird"

== Physiology ==
The species in genus Smithornis lack the vocal ability that many other birds possess. This is due to the muscular anatomy of the main vocal organ, the syrinx. The muscle A1 is widened into a hammer shape and A2 is seen to be oblique. They lack a pessulus, which divides the tympaniform membranes and produces a song in other species of birds. They also lack intrinsic syringeal muscles which contract to change the song.

== Behavior ==
Smithornis are known for the rare ability to make sound with their wings. The typical behavior includes a short circular flight off of the perch and back on again, the vibration of the wings producing the sound. This behavior is commonly seen in the early morning and late evening. The behavior may be related to courtship; the male produces the sound while flashing a white patch on its back when females are present. The sound is made by all species of Smithornis; in S. capensis both sexes perform the behavior, but in S. rufolateralis only the male does so.

One observation involved two individual S. capensis in which one individual flicked its wings, making the sound, while another was close by. They then alternated, taking turns performing the behavior. The behavior did not seem to be aggressive and was thought to be a courtship display.

It was previously assumed that the sound was produced by the long outer 9th and 10th major covert feathers. A recent study tested the assumption by using high-speed video and audio recordings, which indicated that coverts 6 and 7 were actually producing the sound.

== Gallery ==
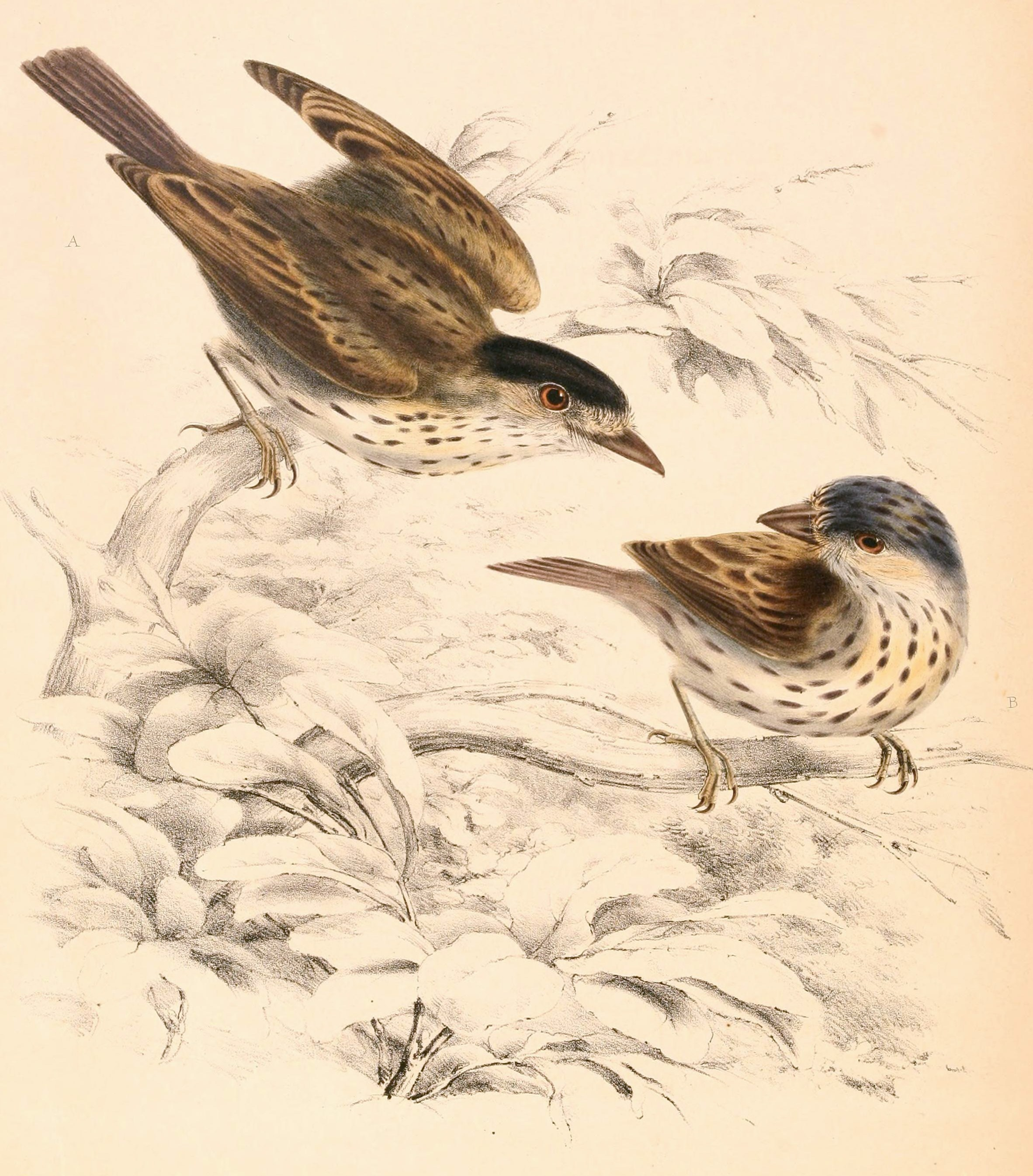
Smithornis capensis capensis, 1838

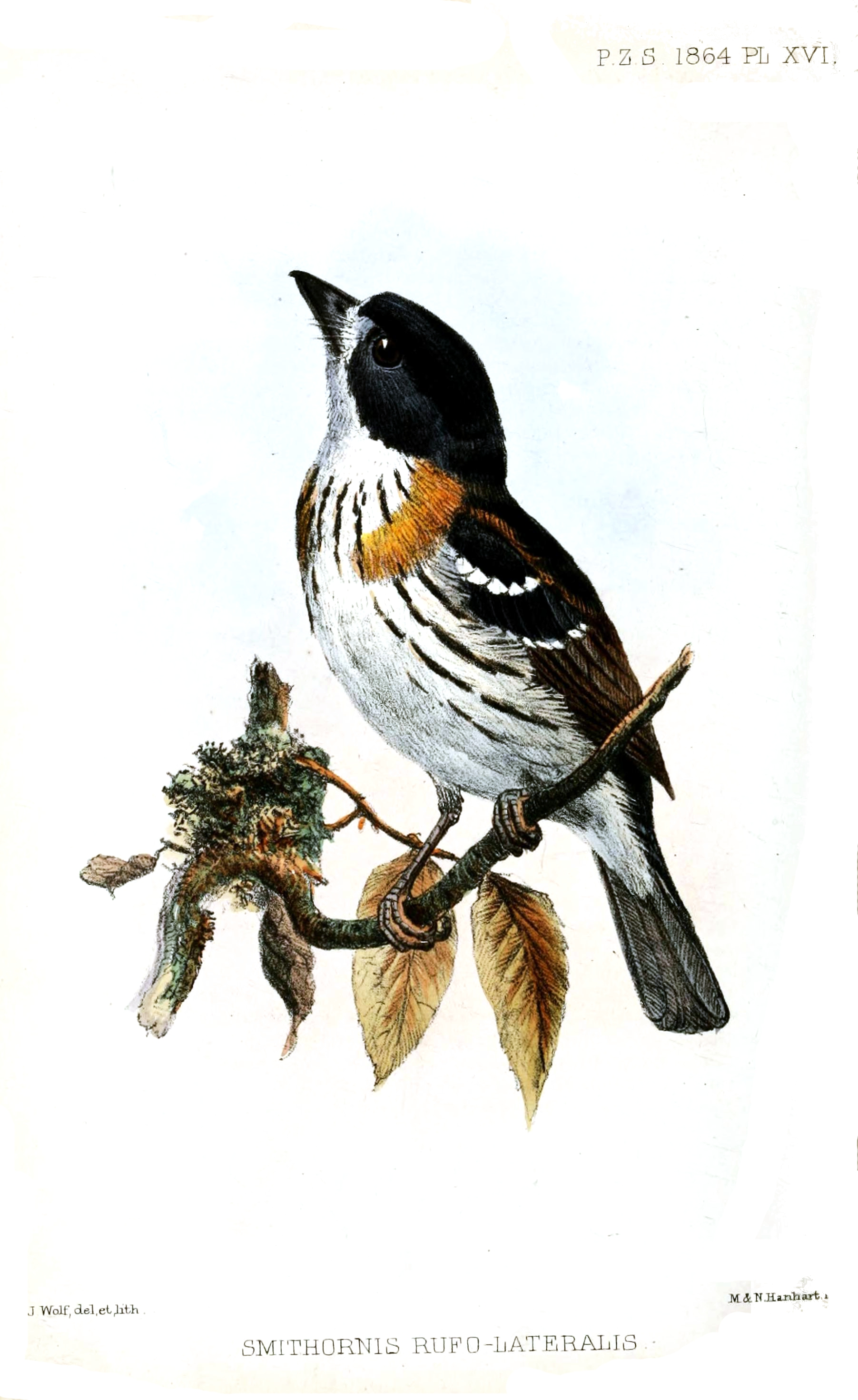
Smithornis rufolateralis
