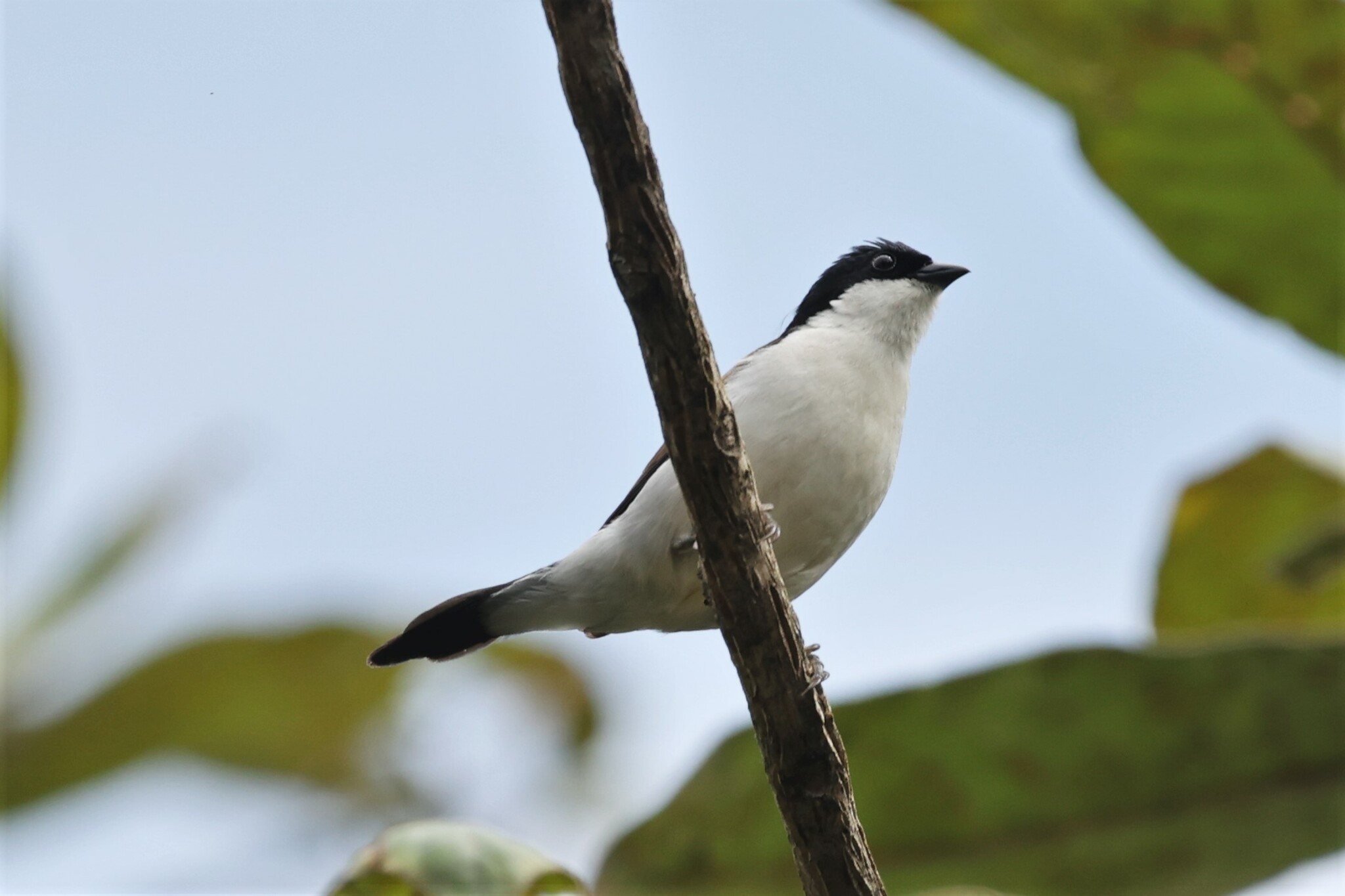

Conservation status
- Least Concern (IUCN 3.1)]

Scientific classification
- Kingdom: Animalia
- Phylum: Chordata
- Class: Aves
- Order: Passeriformes
- Family: Estrildidae
- Genus: Nigrita
- Species: N. fusconotus

Binomial name
- Nigrita fusconotus Fraser, 1843

Synonyms
- Nigrita fusconota Sibley and Monroe, 1990, 1993

= White-breasted nigrita =

Species of bird

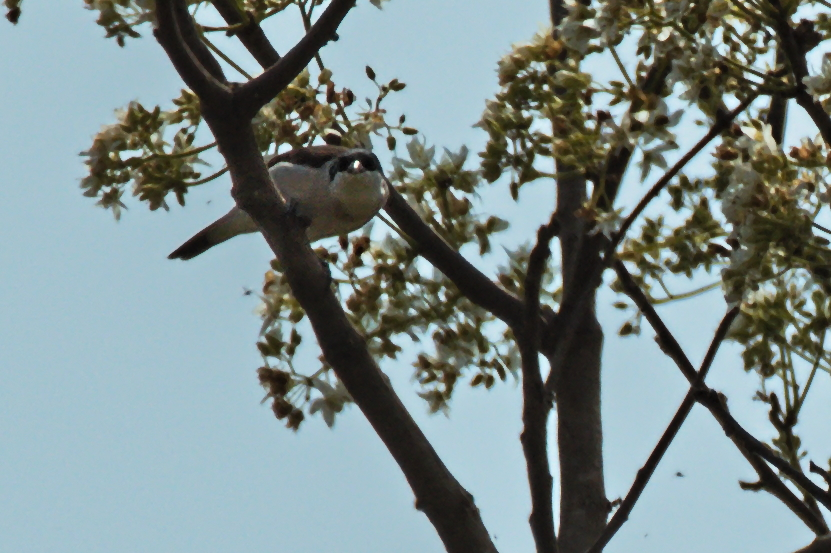
White-breasted Nigrita

The white-breasted nigrita (Nigrita fusconotus) is a very small nigrita with a rather waxbill-like appearance, a black cap and tail contrast with a brown back and wings and white under parts. Both sexes are alike but the immature has the crown, rump and tail browner.

It is widespread throughout the African tropical rainforest. It has an estimated global extent of occurrence of 2,700,000 km^{2}.

The status of the species is evaluated by the IUCN as being of least concern.
