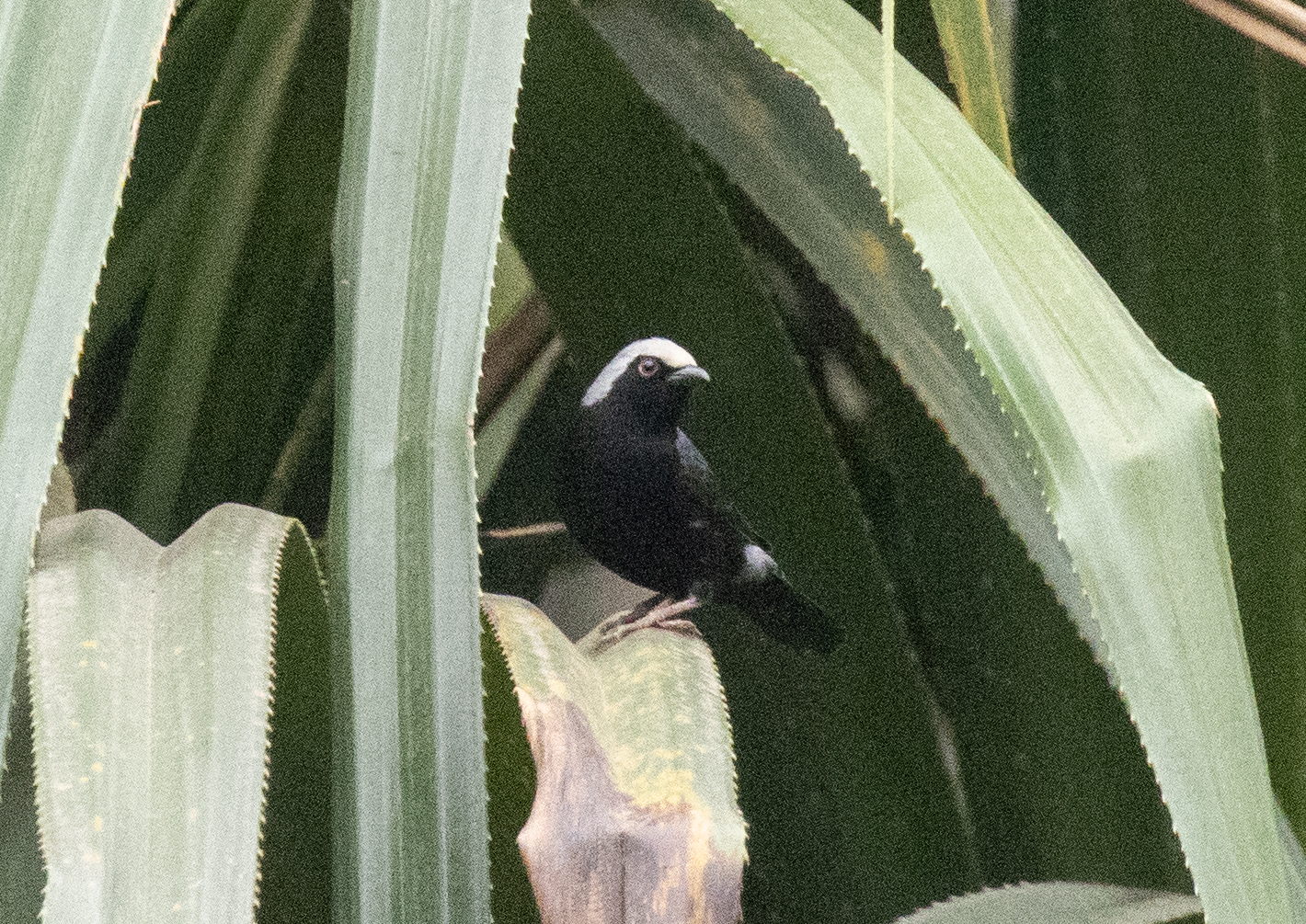

Conservation status
- Least Concern (IUCN 3.1)

Scientific classification
- Kingdom: Animalia
- Phylum: Chordata
- Class: Aves
- Order: Passeriformes
- Family: Estrildidae
- Genus: Nigrita
- Species: N. luteifrons

Binomial name
- Nigrita luteifrons Verreaux & Verreaux, 1851

= Pale-fronted nigrita =

Species of bird

The pale-fronted nigrita (Nigrita luteifrons) is a common species of estrildid finch found in Africa. It has an estimated global extent of occurrence of 2,500,000 km^{2}.

It is widespread throughout the African tropical rainforest (although more sparsely throughout the Upper Guinean forests).

The IUCN has classified the species as being of least concern.
