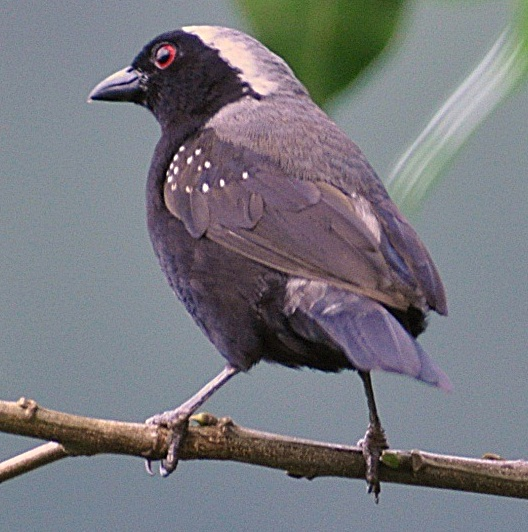

Conservation status
- Least Concern (IUCN 3.1)

Scientific classification
- Kingdom: Animalia
- Phylum: Chordata
- Class: Aves
- Order: Passeriformes
- Family: Estrildidae
- Genus: Nigrita
- Species: N. canicapillus

Binomial name
- Nigrita canicapillus (Strickland, 1841)

= Grey-headed nigrita =

Species of bird

The grey-headed nigrita (Nigrita canicapillus) is a common species of estrildid finch found in Africa. It has an estimated global extent of occurrence of 3,700,000 km^{2}.

It is widespread throughout the African tropical rainforest.

The status of the species is evaluated as Least Concern.

== Taxonomy ==
The grey-headed nigrita was formally described in 1841 by the English naturalist Hugh Edwin Strickland based on a specimen collected on the island of Bioko (formerly named Fernando Pó), off the west coast of Africa. He coined the binomial name Aethiops canicapillus where the specific epithet combines the Latin canus meaning "grey" with -capillus meaning "-capped" or "-headed". The grey-headed nigrita is now one of four species placed in the genus Nigrita that was introduced in 1843 by Strickland.

Six subspecies are recognised:

- N. c. emiliae Sharpe, 1869 – Guinea and Sierra Leone to Togo
- N. c. canicapillus (Strickland, 1841) – south Benin and south Nigeria to central DR Congo and Gabon
- N. c. schistaceus Sharpe, 1891 – south Sudan and east DR Congo to west Kenya and north Tanzania
- N. c. angolensis Bannerman, 1921 – northwest Angola and south DR Congo
- N. c. diabolicus (Reichenow & Neumann, 1895) – central Kenya to north Tanzania
- N. c. candidus Moreau, 1942 – west Tanzania
