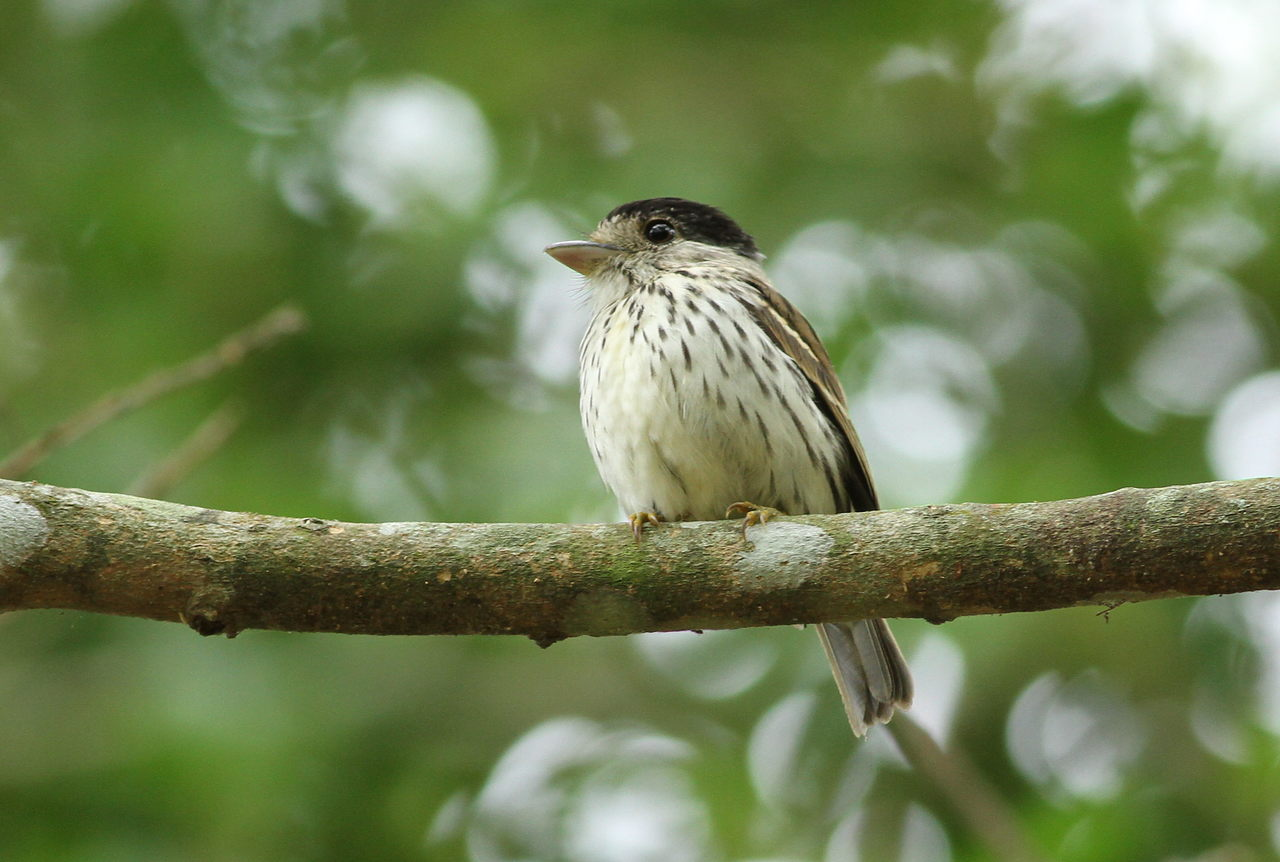

Conservation status
- Least Concern (IUCN 3.1)

Scientific classification
- Kingdom: Animalia
- Phylum: Chordata
- Class: Aves
- Order: Passeriformes
- Family: Calyptomenidae
- Genus: Smithornis
- Species: S. capensis

Binomial name
- Smithornis capensis (Smith, 1839)

Synonyms
- Platyrhynchus capensis A. Smith, 1839

= African broadbill =

Species of bird

The African broadbill (Smithornis capensis), also known as the black-capped broadbill or Delacour's broadbill, is a species of bird in the suboscine family Calyptomenidae.

== Description ==
The African broadbill is a boldly streaked, largely brown, stocky, flycatcher-like bird. They have dark crowns, which are black in the males and grey in the females of the eastern subspecies, and blackish in both sexes of the subspecies S.c. meinertzhageni. The upperparts are mainly olive-brown with black streaks, the bases of the feathers on the lower back and rump are white and are hidden when the bird is at rest. The underparts are buff or creamy-white with black streaks on the flanks and the breast. There is subspecific variation with S.c. meinertzhageni and S.c. suahelicus being whiter below with thicker streaks than, for example S.c. medianus. It measures 12–14 cm (4.7–5.5 in) in length and in South Africa males weighed 21–26.9 g (0.74–0.95 oz) and females 17.4–27.5 g (0.61–0.97 oz).

=== Sound production ===
The African broadbill produces a very loud sound which has been compared to an old-fashioned car horn. It is loud, vibrating "Prrrrup" which is produced during a display flight, and it may be preceded by softer more plaintive "tui-tui-tui" calls, which are also sometimes made without the car horn call.

Unusually, the call of the African broadbill, like other Smithornis birds, is produced by the vibration of its wings during flight, the sound being produced by the sixth and seventh primary feathers.

== Distribution ==
The African broadbill is native to Africa, especially the southeastern part of the continent. There are two separate allopatric distributions, one rather disjunct distribution in coastal West Africa from Sierra Leone in the west eastwards to the Central African Republic and south to Gabon and the northern Congo. The main distribution covers southern and eastern Africa from Kenya south to KwaZulu Natal.

== Habitat ==
The African broadbill occurs in the middle stratum of evergreen or lowland forest, dense deciduous thickets or other dense woodland, including riverine gallery forest.

== Habits ==
Given its preference for dense forests and woodlands and its inconspicuous behaviour the African broadbill can be difficult to see. It often remains motionless for long periods, perching upright on a low horizontal branch and calling infrequently. It feeds exclusively on invertebrates for which it forages on the ground, in the trees and occasionally hawking them in flight. Beetles, grasshoppers, Hemiptera, caterpillars and spiders have all been recorded as food items.

Both sexes perform a display flight, circling around a perch at a radius of 1bout a metre on rapidly fluttering wings, puffing out the back and rump feathers to show their white feather bases and giving the car horn call. The nest is an oval-shaped structure with a side entrance and is built by both sexes from bark, dry leaves, twigs, grass and rootlets, often held together by strands of spider web. It is suspended conspicuously from a low branch of a tree, usually about 1.5–3 m (4.9–9.8 ft) above the ground. The date the eggs are laid vary from country to country, however it is usually from October–January. The clutch size is 1-3 eggs, which are female takes on sole responsibility for incubating, incubation lasts for 16–17 days, while the male keeps guards the nest, signalling danger with a high-pitched call. The development and care of the young is little know but the male is the main provider of food to the young.

== Taxonomy ==
The generic name honours the Scottish zoologist and explorer Dr Andrew Smith who described this species as Platyrhynchus capensis in 1839.

There are currently nine recognised subspecies and they are listed below with their distributions from north west to south:

- Smithornis capensis delacouri Bannerman, 1923 :Sierra Leone, south eastern Guinea and northern Liberia east to Togo.
- Smithornis capensis camarunensis Sharpe, 1905: south eastern Nigeria, southern Cameroon, possibly Equatorial Guinea, N Gabon, north western Congo and locally in the south and east of the Central African Republic.
- Smithornis capensis albigularis Hartert, 1904: western and northern Angola; south-eastern Democratic Republic of Congo and western and probably central Tanzania south to northern Zambia and northern Malawi.
- Smithornis capensis meinertzhageni van Someren, 1919: north eastern Democratic Republic of Congo, Rwanda, Uganda and western Kenya.
- Smithornis capensis medianus Hartert & van Someren, 1916: central Kenya and north eastern Tanzania.
- Smithornis capensis suahelicus Grote, 1926: south-eastern Kenya, eastern Tanzania and north-eastern Mozambique.
- Smithornis capensis conjunctus Clancey, 1963: the Caprivi Strip of north eastern Namibia, northern Botswana, southern Zambia, northern and western Zimbabwe and north western Mozambique.
- Smithornis capensis cryptoleucus Clancey, 1963: south-western Tanzania, eastern Zimbabwe, southern Malawi, and central and southern Mozambique south to north eastern Northern Province and north eastern KwaZulu-Natal in South Africa and eastern Eswatini.
- Smithornis capensis capensis (A. Smith, 1839) – south eastern KwaZulu-Natal.

== Conservation status ==
This bird has a large range and is common in several regions. In southern Africa it has a scattered distribution because of habitat fragmentation in the area. In general it is considered to be a least-concern species, but it is locally vulnerable due to loss of habitat.

This species lives in forests, dense woodland, and riparian thickets.
