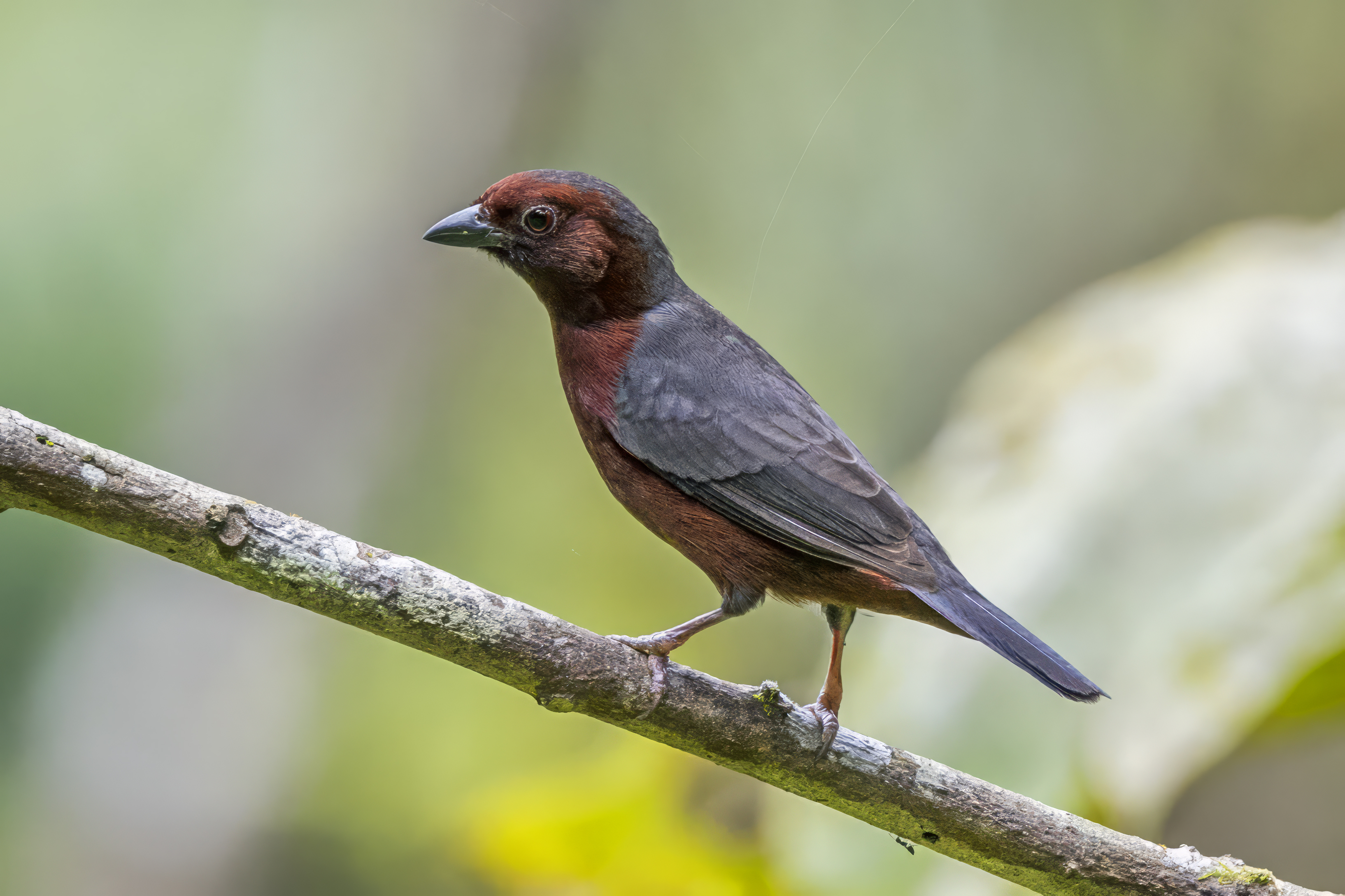
- Ankasa National Park, Ghana

Conservation status
- Least Concern (IUCN 3.1)

Scientific classification
- Kingdom: Animalia
- Phylum: Chordata
- Class: Aves
- Order: Passeriformes
- Family: Estrildidae
- Genus: Nigrita
- Species: N. bicolor

Binomial name
- Nigrita bicolor (Hartlaub, 1844)

= Chestnut-breasted nigrita =

Species of bird

The chestnut-breasted nigrita (Nigrita bicolor) is a common species of estrildid finch found in Africa. It has an estimated global extent of occurrence of 3,000,000 km^{2}.

== Habitat ==
The chestnut-breasted nigrita inhabits subtropical or tropical (lowland) forest, mangrove and shrubland habitats of the African tropical rainforest.

The status of the species is evaluated as Least Concern.
