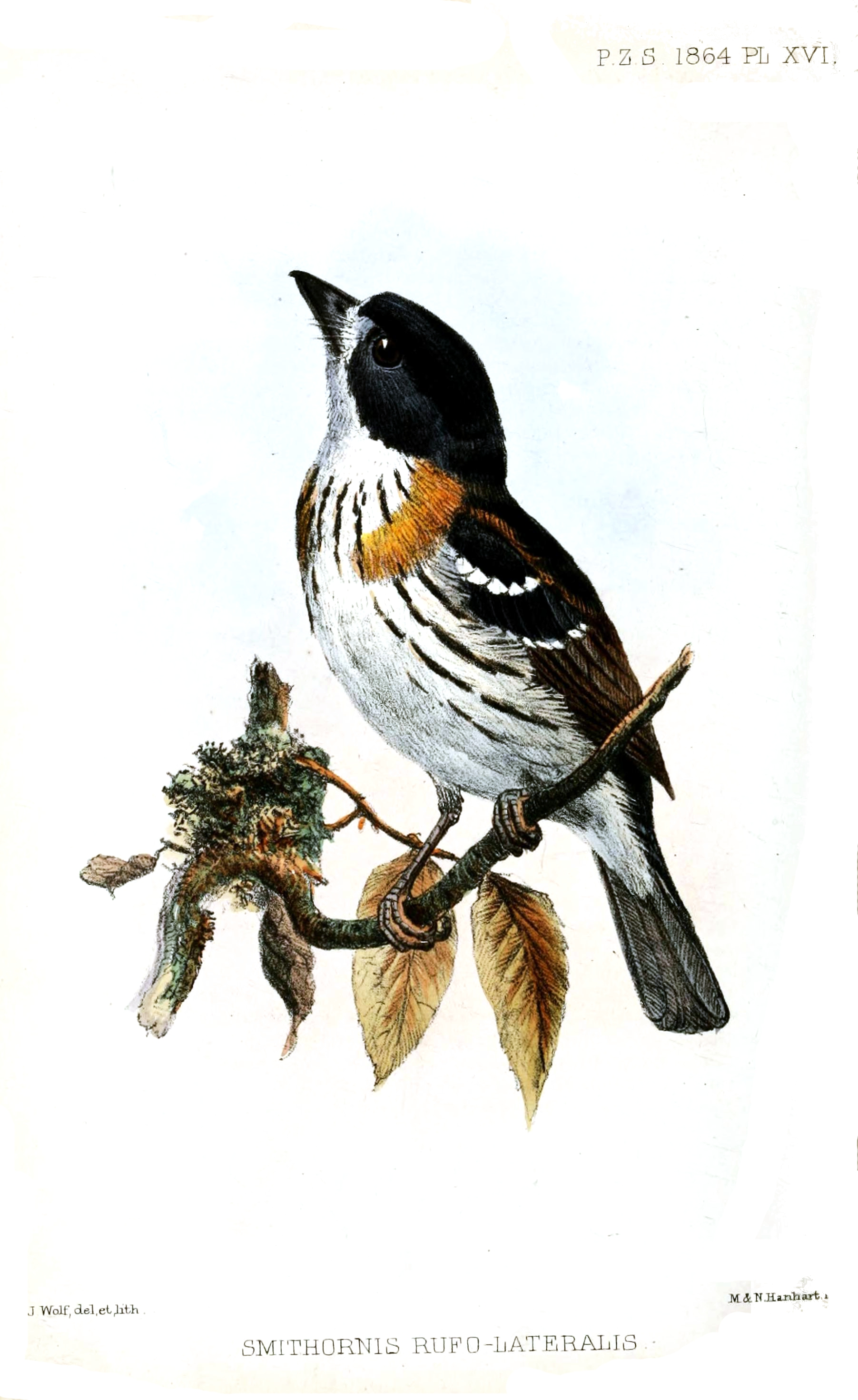

Conservation status
- Least Concern (IUCN 3.1)

Scientific classification
- Kingdom: Animalia
- Phylum: Chordata
- Class: Aves
- Order: Passeriformes
- Family: Calyptomenidae
- Genus: Smithornis
- Species: S. rufolateralis

Binomial name
- Smithornis rufolateralis Gray, GR, 1864

= Rufous-sided broadbill =

Species of bird

The rufous-sided broadbill (Smithornis rufolateralis) is a species of bird in the family Calyptomenidae.

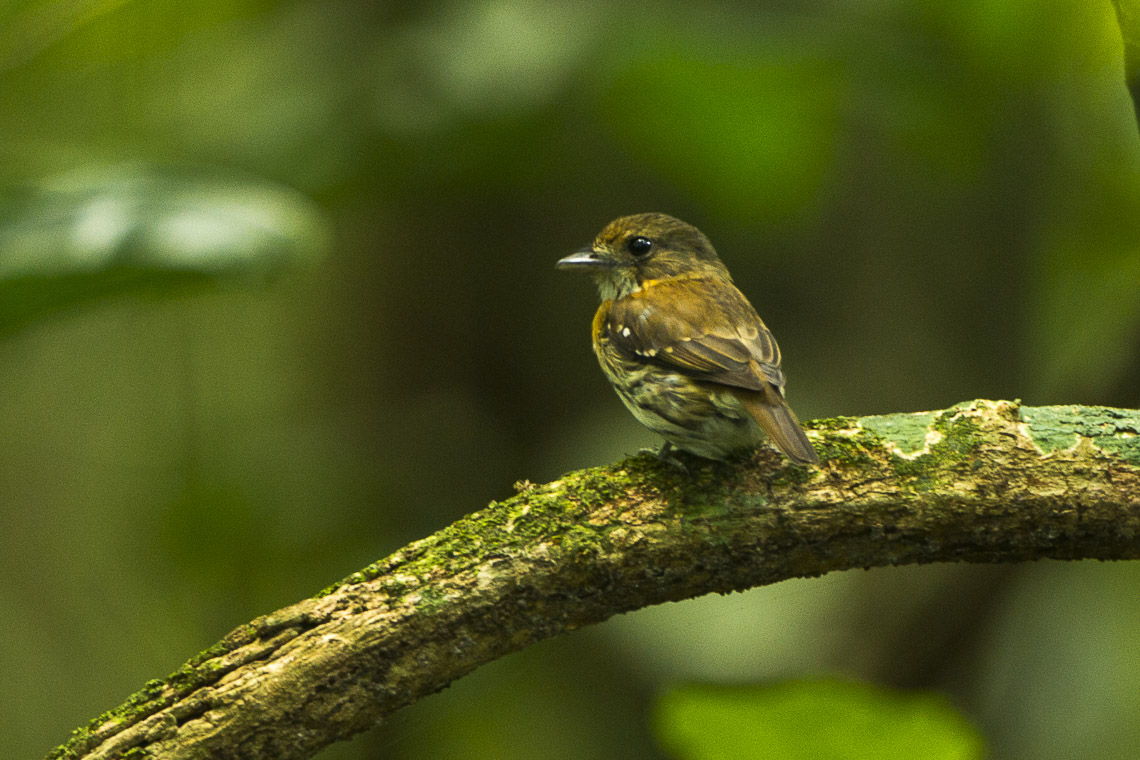
A female bird.

It is sparsely distributed throughout the Guineo-Congolian region.

Its natural habitat is subtropical or tropical moist lowland forests.
