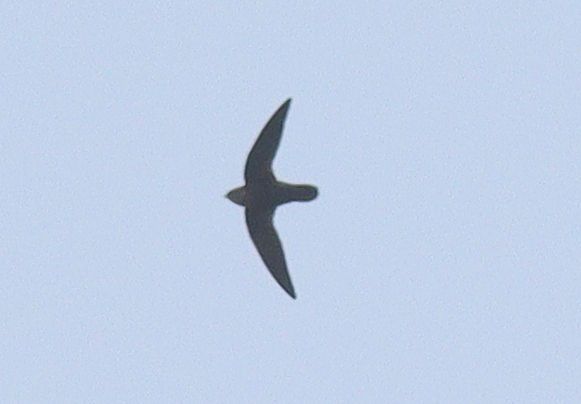

Conservation status
- Least Concern (IUCN 3.1)

Scientific classification
- Kingdom: Animalia
- Phylum: Chordata
- Class: Aves
- Clade: Strisores
- Order: Apodiformes
- Family: Apodidae
- Genus: Telacanthura
- Species: T. melanopygia

Binomial name
- Telacanthura melanopygia (Chapin, 1915)

= Black spinetail =

Species of bird

The black spinetail (Telacanthura melanopygia) is a species of swift in the family Apodidae. It is native to the African tropical rainforest.
