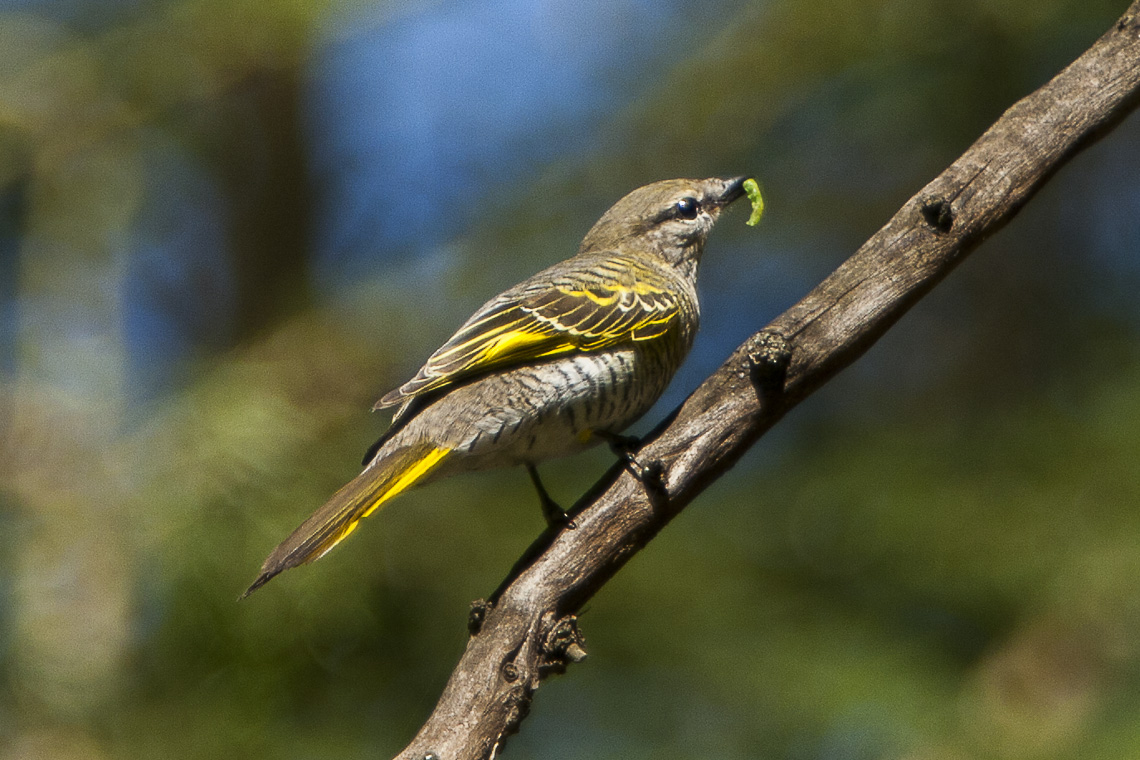
- Female
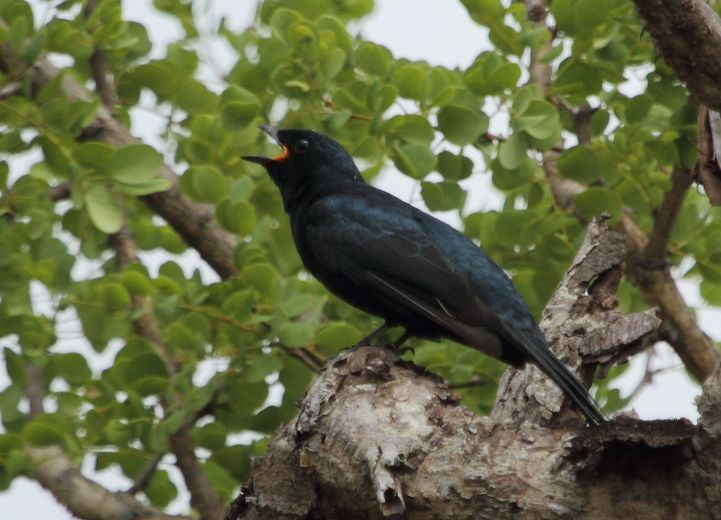
- Male

Conservation status
- Least Concern (IUCN 3.1)

Scientific classification
- Kingdom: Animalia
- Phylum: Chordata
- Class: Aves
- Order: Passeriformes
- Family: Campephagidae
- Genus: Campephaga
- Species: C. flava

Binomial name
- Campephaga flava Vieillot, 1817
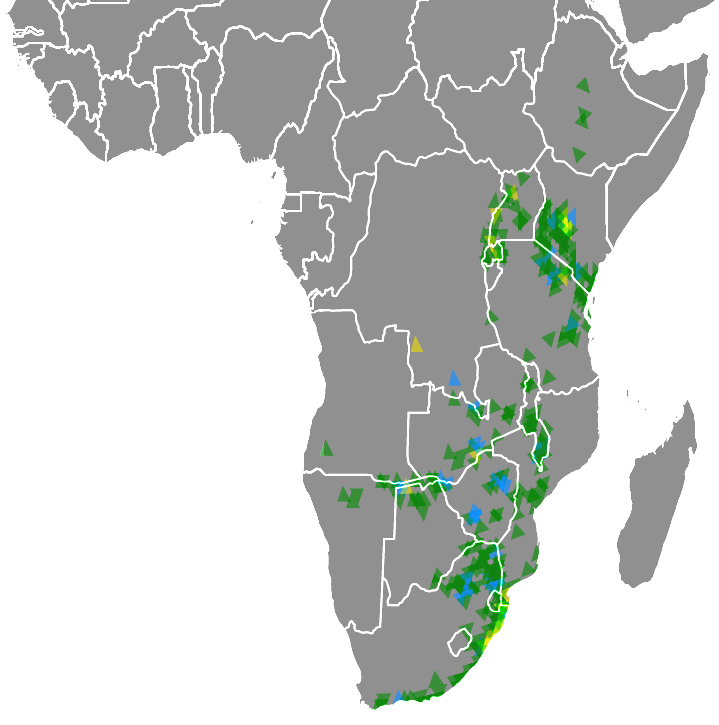
- Global range Year-Round Range Summer Range Winter Range

= Black cuckooshrike =

Species of bird

The black cuckooshrike (Campephaga flava) is a species of bird in the cuckooshrike family Campephagidae. The species is closely related to Petit's cuckooshrike and the red-shouldered cuckooshrike, and forms a superspecies with them. It is also known as the African black cuckooshrike.

It is found in Angola, Botswana, Burundi, Democratic Republic of the Congo, Eswatini, Ethiopia, Kenya, Malawi, Mozambique, Namibia, Rwanda, Somalia, South Africa, South Sudan, Tanzania, Uganda, Zambia, and Zimbabwe.

Its natural habitats are subtropical or tropical moist lowland forests, dry savanna, and subtropical or tropical dry shrubland.
