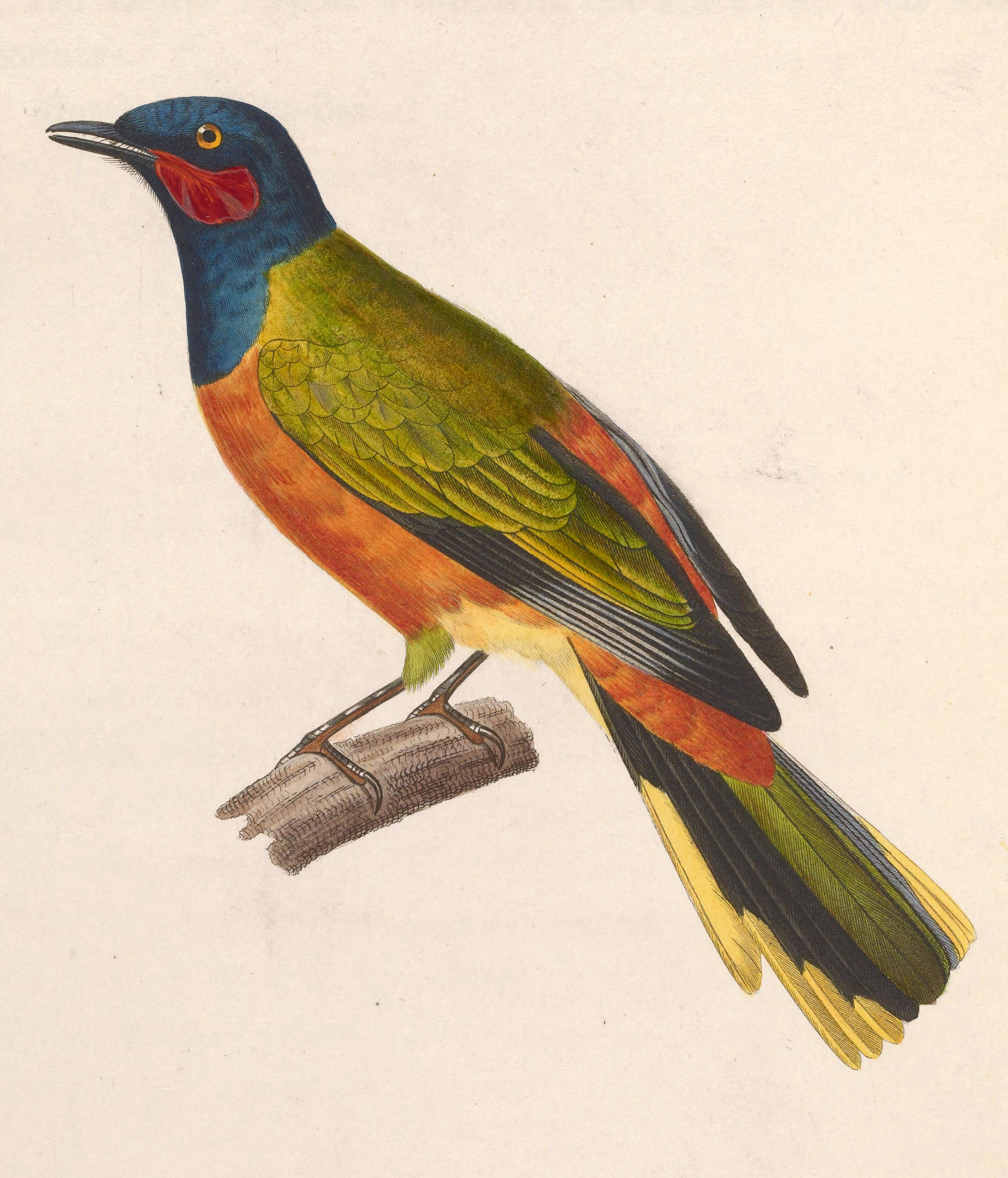

Conservation status
- Vulnerable (IUCN 3.1)

Scientific classification
- Kingdom: Animalia
- Phylum: Chordata
- Class: Aves
- Order: Passeriformes
- Family: Campephagidae
- Genus: Lobotos
- Species: L. lobatus

Binomial name
- Lobotos lobatus (Temminck, 1824)

Synonyms
- Campephaga lobata

= Western wattled cuckooshrike =

Species of bird

The western wattled cuckooshrike or Ghana cuckooshrike (Lobotos lobatus) is a species of bird in the family Campephagidae. It is native to the Upper Guinean Forests. Its natural habitats are subtropical or tropical moist lowland forest and subtropical or tropical swamps. It is threatened by habitat loss.
