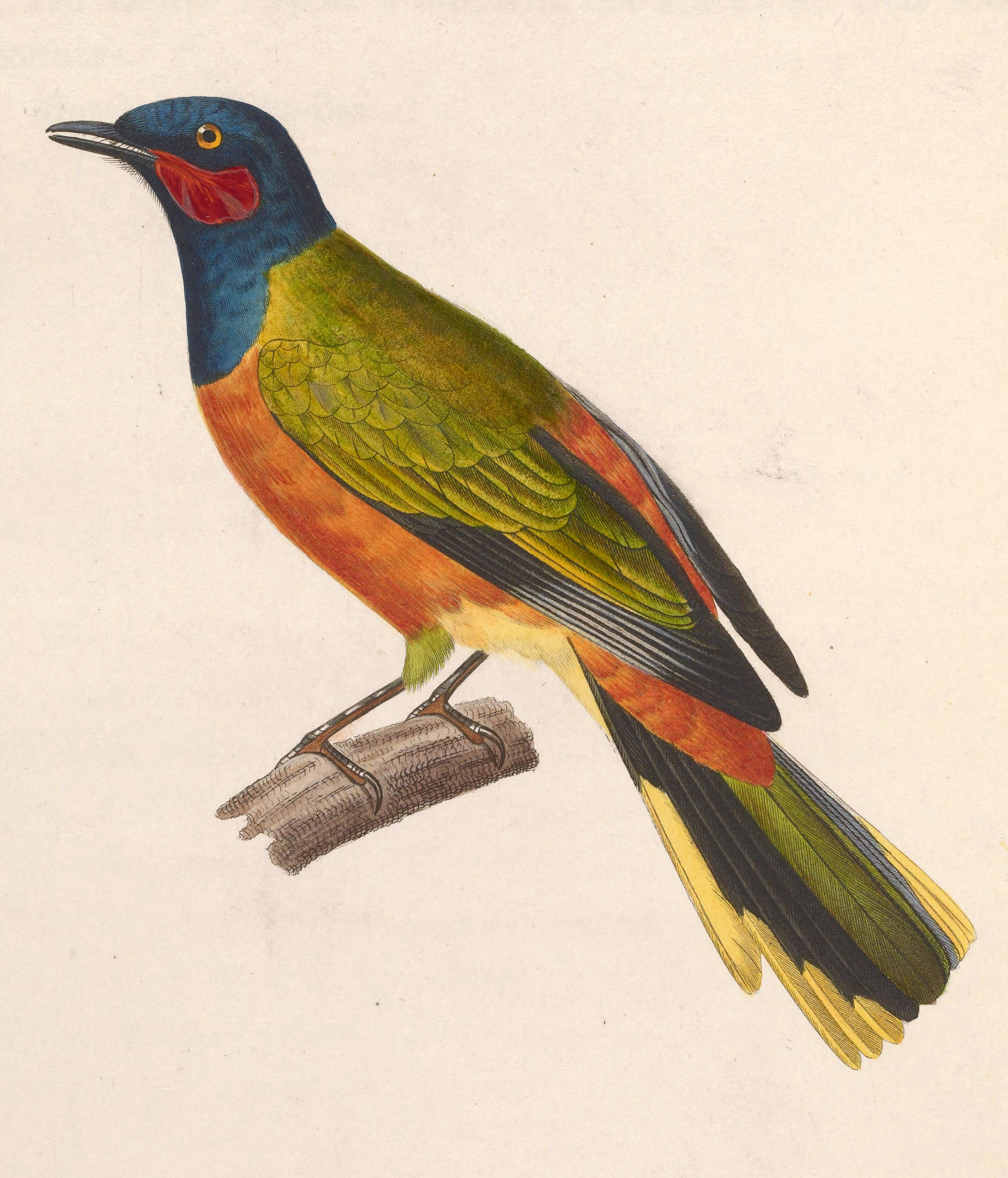
- Western wattled cuckooshrike (Lobotos lobatus)

Scientific classification
- Kingdom: Animalia
- Phylum: Chordata
- Class: Aves
- Order: Passeriformes
- Family: Campephagidae
- Genus: Lobotos; Reichenbach, 1850

Type species
- Lobotos temminckii Hartlaub, 1854

= Lobotos =

Genus of bird

Lobotos is a genus of bird in the cuckooshrike family Campephagidae. It is sometimes included in the genus Campephaga. It contains the following two species:

Image	Scientific name	Common name
	Lobotos lobatus	Western wattled cuckooshrike
	Lobotos oriolinus	Eastern wattled cuckooshrike
