= C. petiti =

C. petiti may refer to:

- Campephaga petiti, the Petit's cuckoo-shrike, a bird species
- Cottus petiti, the chub of Lez, a fish species endemic to France
