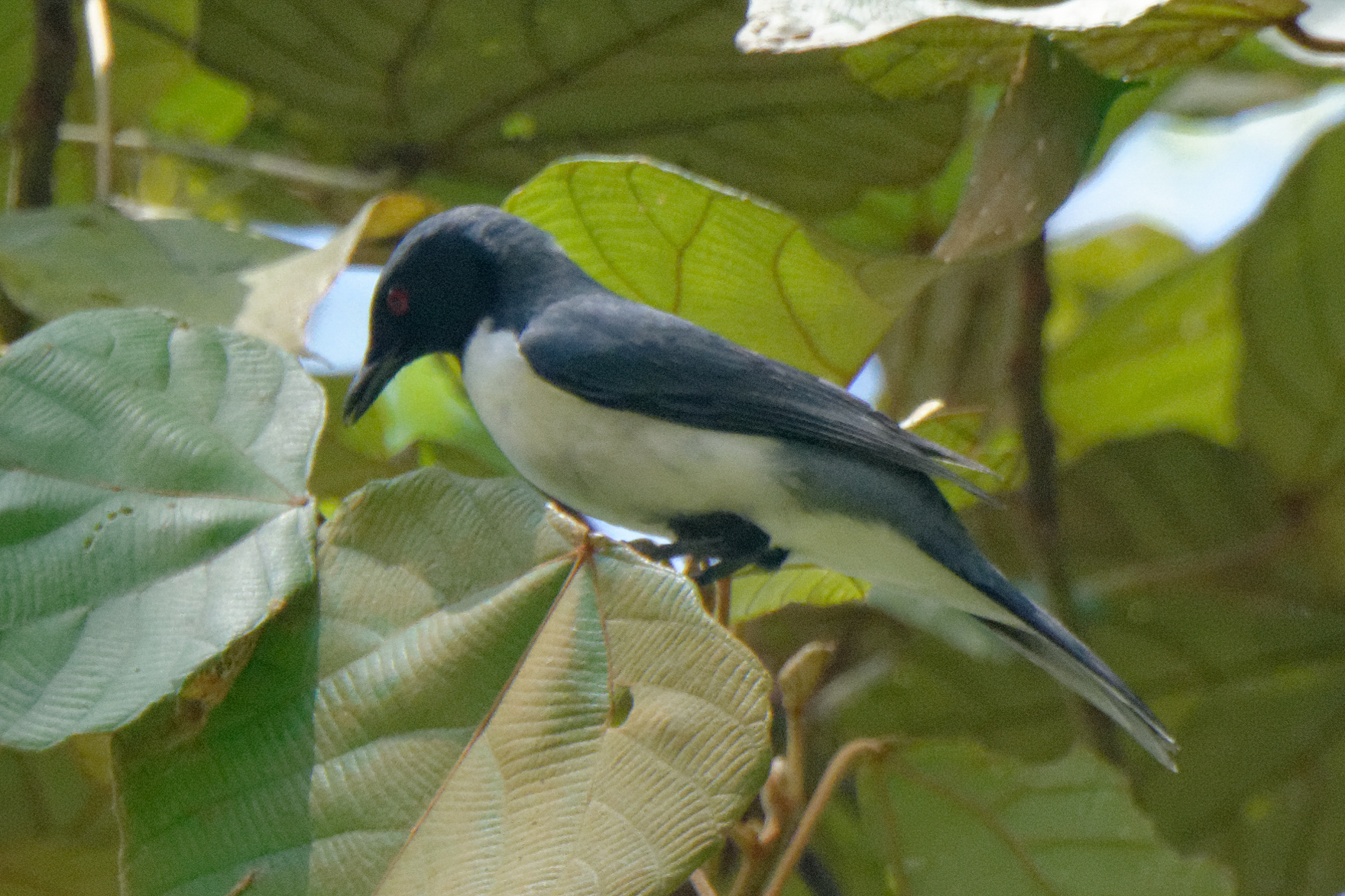

Conservation status
- Least Concern (IUCN 3.1)

Scientific classification
- Kingdom: Animalia
- Phylum: Chordata
- Class: Aves
- Order: Passeriformes
- Family: Campephagidae
- Genus: Celebesica; Strand, 1928
- Species: C. abbotti

Binomial name
- Celebesica abbotti (Riley, 1918)

Synonyms
- Coracina abbotti

= Pygmy cuckooshrike =

Species of bird

Pygmy Cuckooshrike in Sulawesi

The pygmy cuckooshrike (Celebesica abbotti) is a species of bird in the cuckooshrike family Campephagidae. It is endemic to the Indonesian island of Sulawesi. Its natural habitat is subtropical or tropical moist montane forests.

This species was formerly placed in the genus Coracina. A molecular phylogenetic study published in 2010 found the genus Coracina was non-monophyletic. In the resulting reorganization to create monophyletic genera, the pygmy cuckooshrike is the only species placed in the resurrected genus Celebesica.
