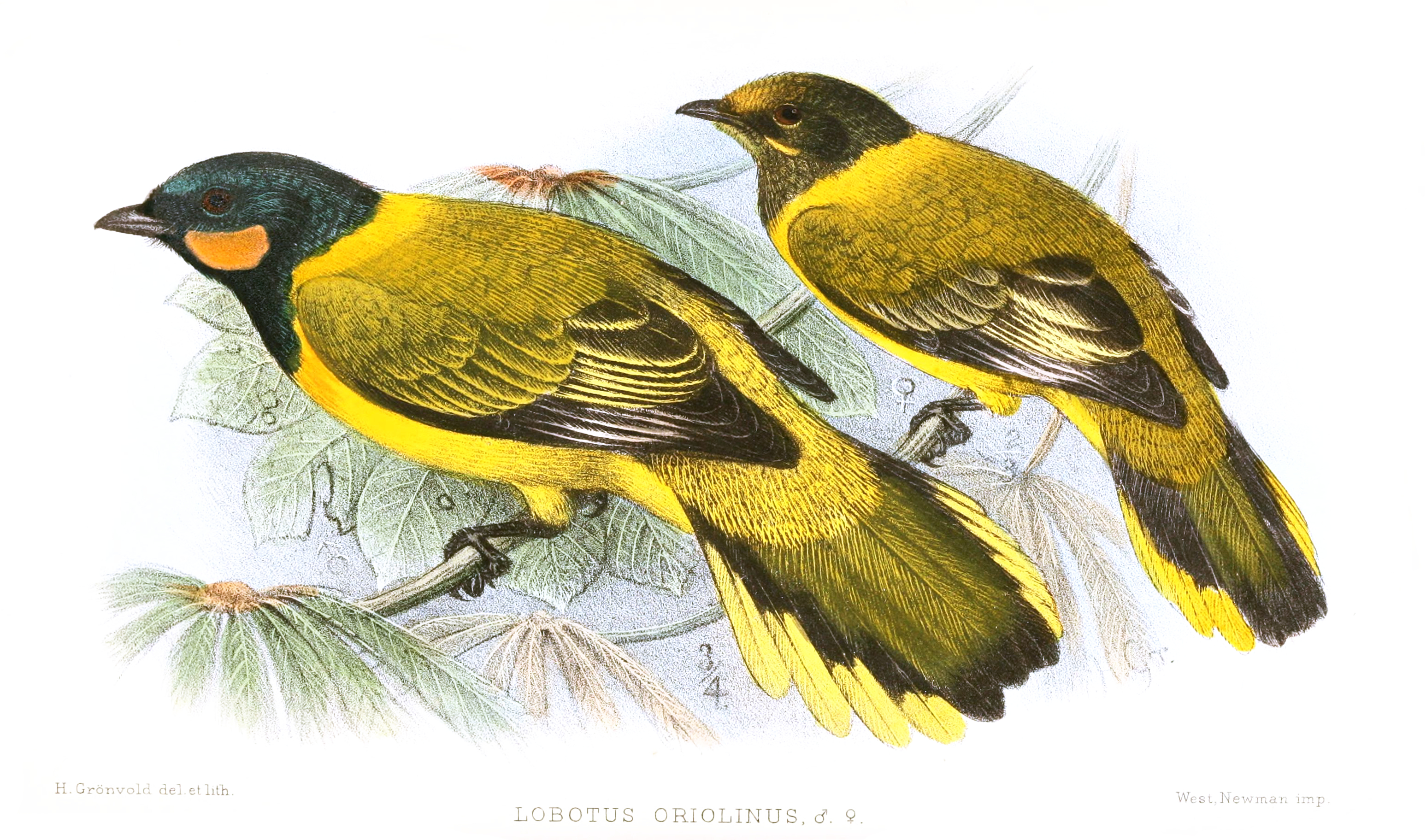

Conservation status
- Data Deficient (IUCN 3.1)

Scientific classification
- Kingdom: Animalia
- Phylum: Chordata
- Class: Aves
- Order: Passeriformes
- Family: Campephagidae
- Genus: Lobotos
- Species: L. oriolinus

Binomial name
- Lobotos oriolinus Bates, 1909

Synonyms
- Campephaga oriolina

= Eastern wattled cuckooshrike =

Species of bird

The eastern wattled cuckooshrike or oriole cuckooshrike (Lobotos oriolinus) is a species of bird in the family Campephagidae. It is found in Cameroon, Central African Republic, Republic of the Congo, Democratic Republic of the Congo, Gabon, and Nigeria. Its natural habitat is subtropical or tropical moist lowland forest.
