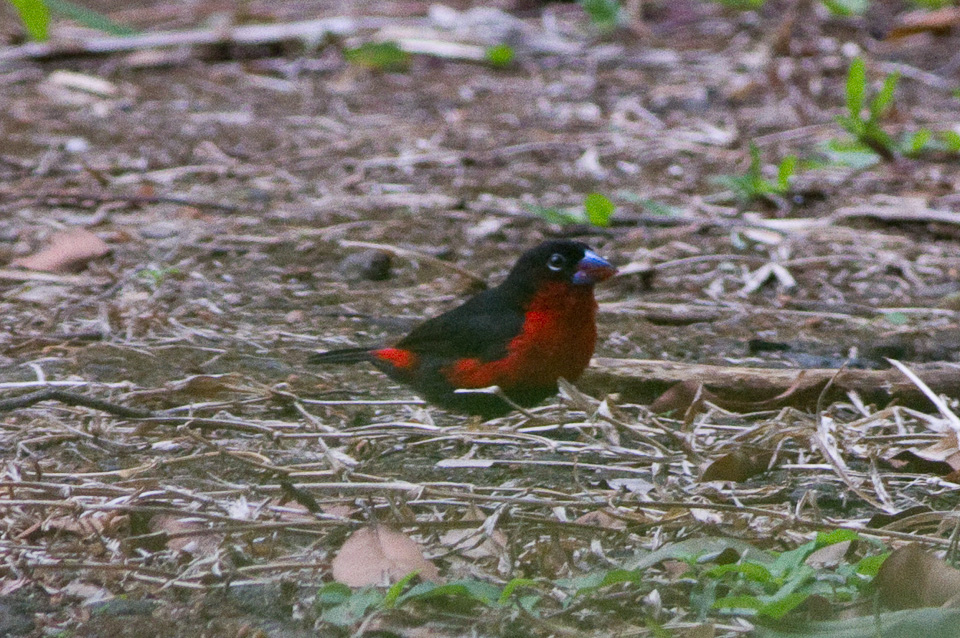
- Western bluebill (Spermophaga haematina)

Scientific classification
- Kingdom: Animalia
- Phylum: Chordata
- Class: Aves
- Order: Passeriformes
- Family: Estrildidae
- Genus: Spermophaga; Swainson, 1837

Type species
- Spermophaga cyanorynchus Swainson, 1837=Loxia haematina Vieillot, 1807

Species
- S. poliogenys S. haematina S. ruficapilla

= Bluebill =

Bluebills

Genus of birds

The bluebills are the genus Spermophaga of the estrildid finches family. These birds are found in tropical Africa. They are gregarious seed eaters with short, thick, blue and red bills. All have plumage which is mainly crimson and black or dark grey.

== Taxonomy ==
The genus Spermophaga was introduced in 1837 by the English zoologist William Swainson to accommodate a single species Spermophaga cyanorhynchus Swainson. This taxon is now treated as a junior synonym of Loxia haematina that had been described by Louis Pierre Vieillot in 1807, the western bluebill. The genus name combines the Ancient Greek σπερμα/sperma, σπερματος/spermatos meaning "seed" with -φαγος/-phagos meaning "-eating".

== Species ==
The genus contains the following three species:

Image	Common name	Scientific name	Distribution
	Grant's bluebill	Spermophaga poliogenys	Republic of Congo, the Democratic Republic of the Congo and Uganda.
	Western bluebill	Spermophaga haematina	Angola, Benin, Cameroon, Central African Republic, the Republic of Congo, the Democratic Republic of the Congo, Côte d'Ivoire, Equatorial Guinea, Gabon, Gambia, Ghana, Guinea, Guinea-Bissau, Liberia, Mali, Nigeria, Senegal, Sierra Leone and Togo.
	Red-headed bluebill	Spermophaga ruficapilla	Angola, Burundi, Central African Republic, The Democratic Republic of the Congo, Kenya, Rwanda, South Sudan, Tanzania and Uganda.
