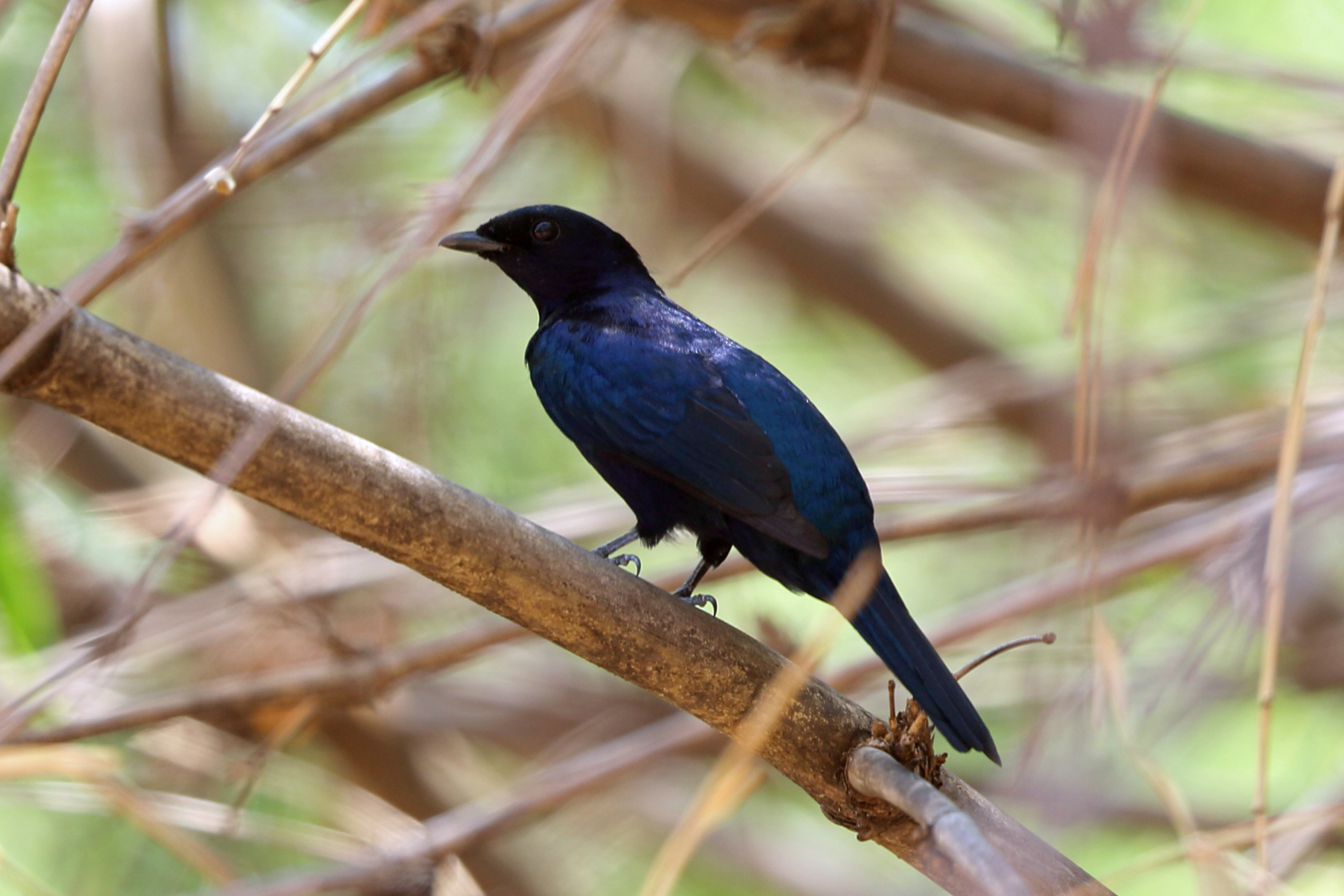

Conservation status
- Least Concern (IUCN 3.1)

Scientific classification
- Kingdom: Animalia
- Phylum: Chordata
- Class: Aves
- Order: Passeriformes
- Family: Campephagidae
- Genus: Campephaga
- Species: C. quiscalina

Binomial name
- Campephaga quiscalina Finsch, 1869

= Purple-throated cuckooshrike =

Species of bird

The purple-throated cuckooshrike (Campephaga quiscalina) is a species of bird in the family Campephagidae. It is found in Angola, Benin, Cameroon, Central African Republic, Republic of the Congo, Democratic Republic of the Congo, Ivory Coast, Equatorial Guinea, Gabon, Ghana, Guinea, Kenya, Liberia, Mali, Nigeria, Sierra Leone, South Sudan, Tanzania, Togo, Uganda, and Zambia. Its natural habitats are subtropical or tropical dry forest, subtropical or tropical moist lowland forest, and subtropical or tropical moist montane forest.
