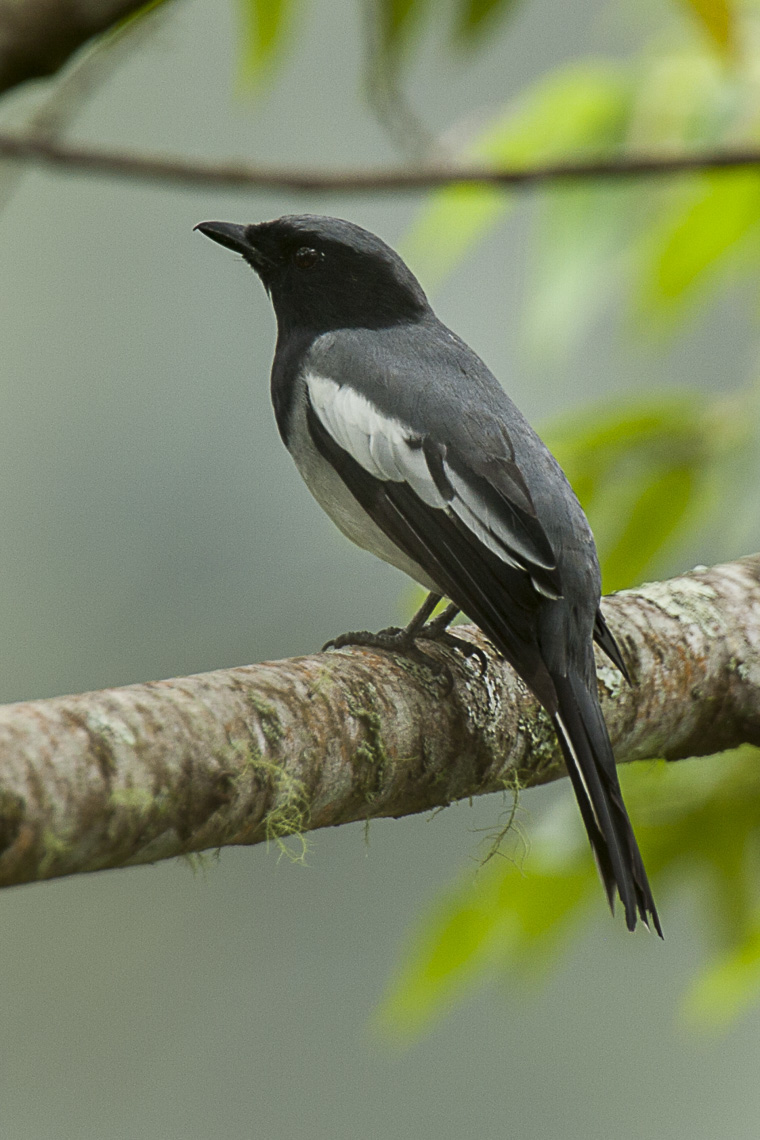
- Male
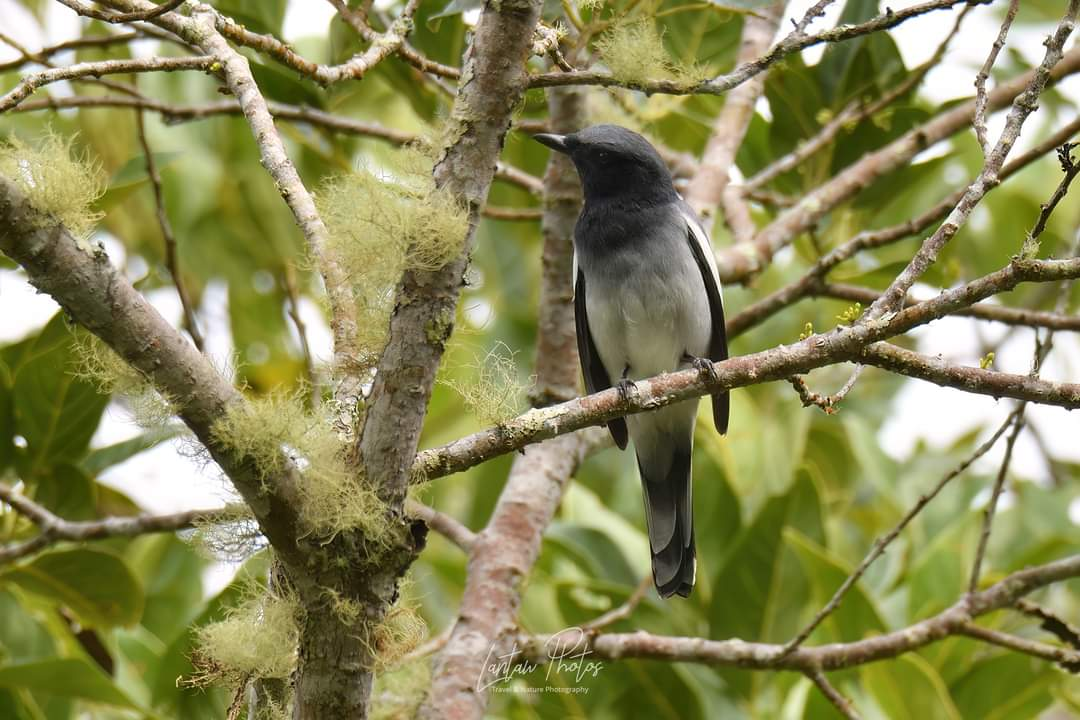
- Female

Conservation status
- Least Concern (IUCN 3.1)

Scientific classification
- Kingdom: Animalia
- Phylum: Chordata
- Class: Aves
- Order: Passeriformes
- Family: Campephagidae
- Genus: Malindangia; Mearns, 1907
- Species: M. mcgregori

Binomial name
- Malindangia mcgregori Mearns, 1907

Synonyms
- Coracina mcgregori

= McGregor's cuckooshrike =

Species of bird

McGregor's cuckooshrike (Malindangia mcgregori) or the sharp-tailed cuckooshrike, is a species of bird in the family Campephagidae. It is endemic to Mindanao island on the Philippines. Its natural habitat is tropical moist montane forest. It is declining due to habitat loss.

== Taxonomy ==
McGregor's cuckooshrike was formally described in 1907 by the American ornithologist Edgar Alexander Mearns as Malindangia mcgregori based on a specimen collected on Mount Malindang, Mindanao, Philippines. The specific epithet was chosen to honour the Australian/American ornithologist Richard Crittenden McGregor.

This species was formerly placed in the genus Coracina. A molecular phylogenetic study published in 2010 found the genus Coracina was non-monophyletic. In the resulting reorganization to create monophyletic genera, McGregor's cuckooshrike is the only species placed in the resurrected genus Malindangia.

Diet is unknown but presumed to feed on insects. Forages in groups in the cannopy typically in pairs or in mixed species flocks.

== Ecology and behavior ==
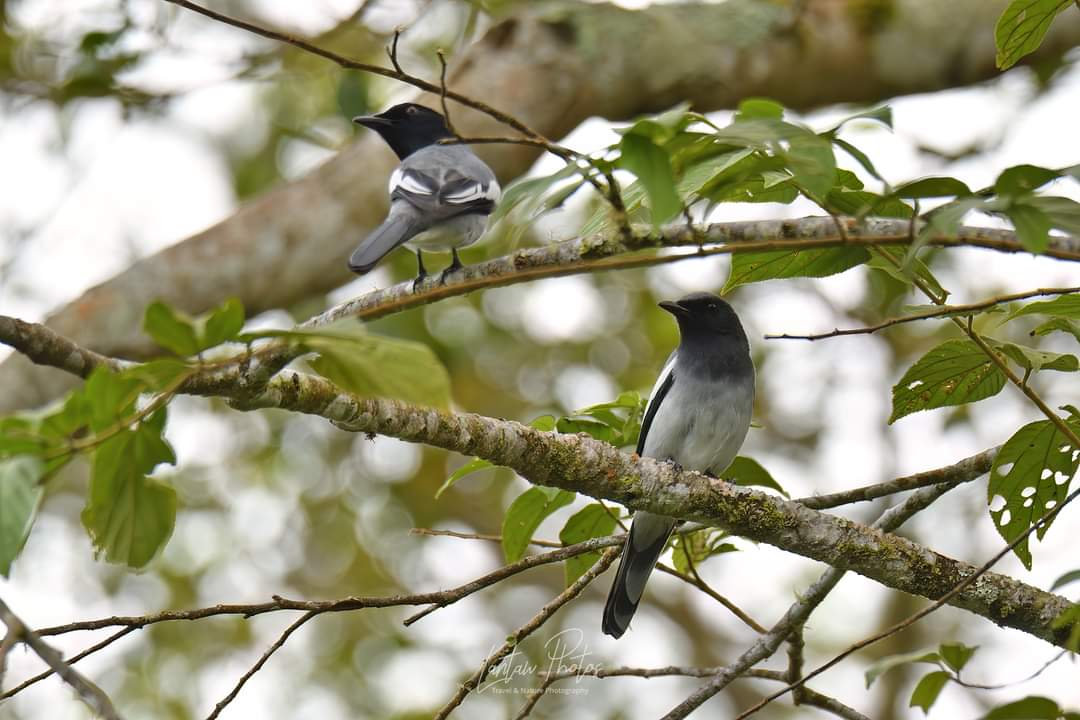
A pair of McGregor's cuckooshrike in Mount Melibengoy

Its diet has not yet been recorded but it is presumed to feed on insects. Occurs singly, in small groups or with mixed-species flocks of other medium sized birds. It is often inconspicuous and quiet. Typically forages in the canopy.

Specimens collected of birds in breeding condition with enlarged gonads from April to June but recently fledged birds have also been seen in March. No other information is known about its mating, nesting and fledgeling habits.

== Habitat and conservation status ==
The species inhabits tropical montane forest above 1,000 metres (3,300 ft) above sea level. The IUCN has classified the species as least Concern but was formerly listed as near threatened. Despite its limited range, it is said to be locally common. As it occurs in rugged and inaccessible mountains, this has allowed a large portion of its habitat to remain intact. However, there it is still affected by habitat loss through deforestation, mining, land conversion and slash-and-burn - just not to the same extent as lowland forest. Due to these continuing threats, population is still decreasing.
