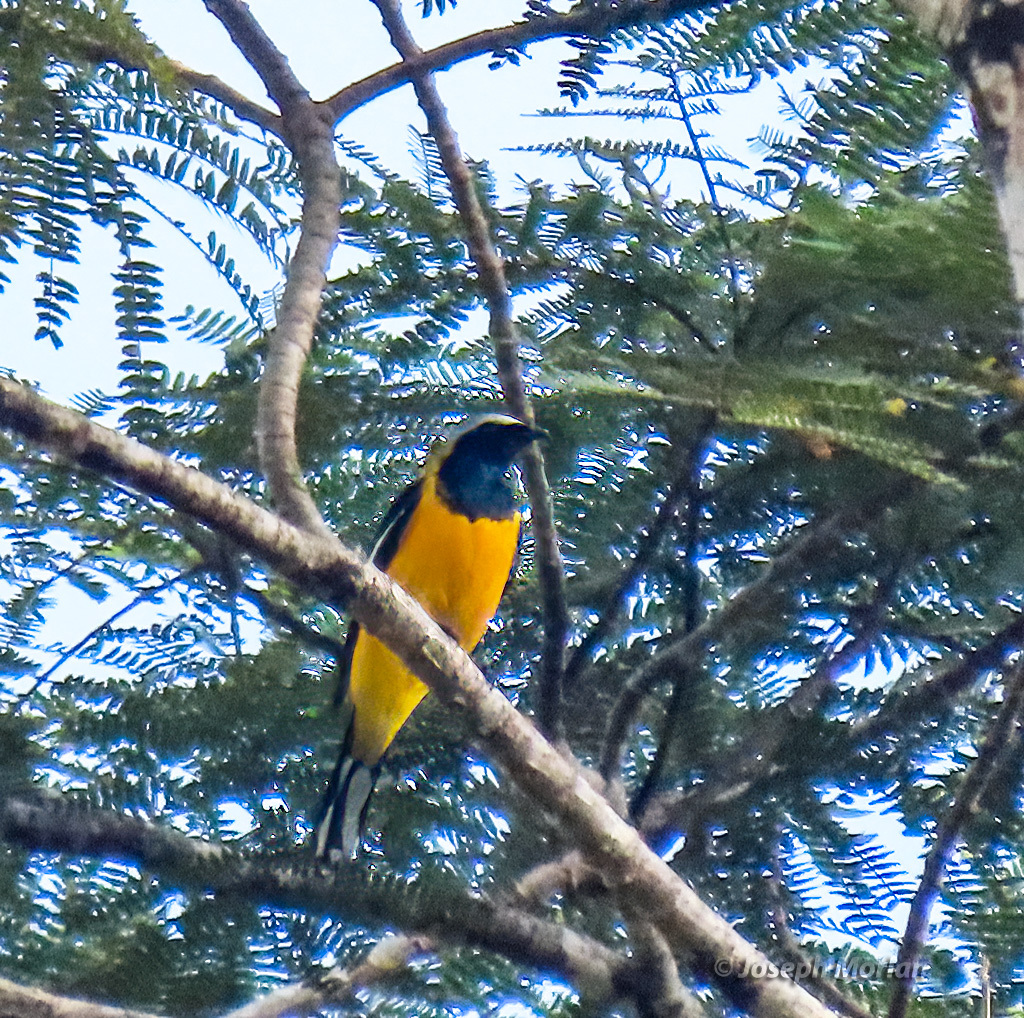

Conservation status
- Least Concern (IUCN 3.1)

Scientific classification
- Kingdom: Animalia
- Phylum: Chordata
- Class: Aves
- Order: Passeriformes
- Family: Campephagidae
- Genus: Campochaera; Sharpe, 1878
- Species: C. sloetii

Binomial name
- Campochaera sloetii (Schlegel, 1866)

= Golden cuckooshrike =

Species of bird

The golden cuckooshrike (Campochaera sloetii) is a species of bird in the family Campephagidae. It is monotypic within the genus Campochaera. It is found in New Guinea. Its natural habitat is subtropical or tropical moist lowland forests.
