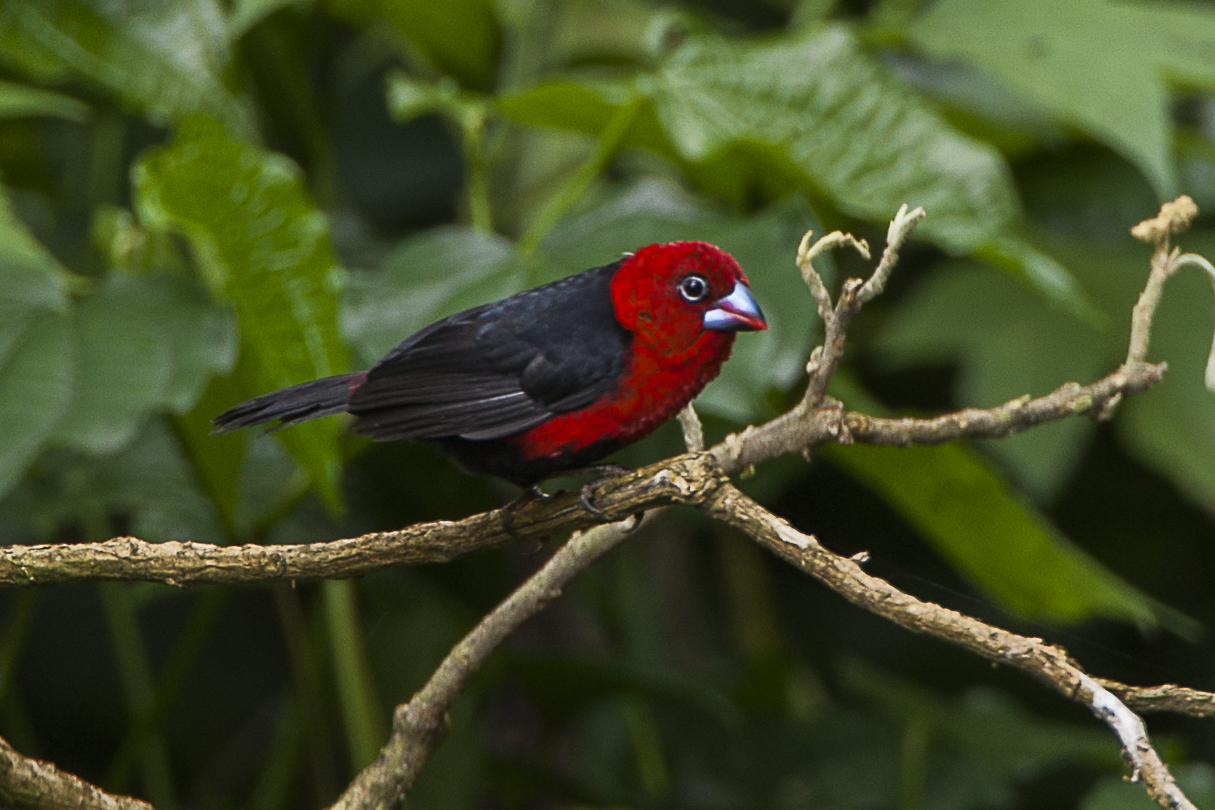

Conservation status
- Least Concern (IUCN 3.1)

Scientific classification
- Kingdom: Animalia
- Phylum: Chordata
- Class: Aves
- Order: Passeriformes
- Family: Estrildidae
- Genus: Spermophaga
- Species: S. ruficapilla

Binomial name
- Spermophaga ruficapilla (Shelley, 1888)

= Red-headed bluebill =

Species of bird

The red-headed bluebill (Spermophaga ruficapilla) is a common species of estrildid finch found in Sub-Saharan Africa.

It is found in Angola, Burundi, Central African Republic, The Democratic Republic of the Congo, Kenya, Rwanda, South Sudan, Tanzania and Uganda.

This species has a large range, with an estimated global extent of occurrence of 560,000 km^{2}. The global population size has not been quantified, but it is believed to be large as the species is described as "frequent" in at least parts of its range (Fry and Keith 2004). Global population trends have not been quantified, but the species is not believed to approach the thresholds for the population decline criterion of the IUCN Red List (i.e. declining more than 30% in ten years or three generations). For these reasons, the species is evaluated as being of least concern.
