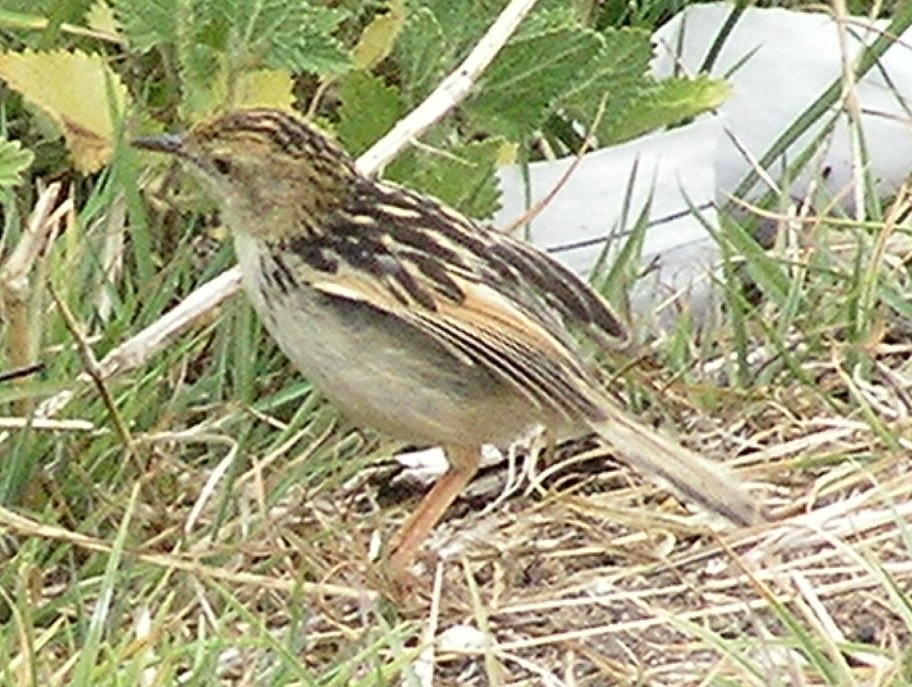
- Courting male, Debre Berhan, Ethiopia

Conservation status
- Least Concern (IUCN 3.1)

Scientific classification
- Kingdom: Animalia
- Phylum: Chordata
- Class: Aves
- Order: Passeriformes
- Family: Cisticolidae
- Genus: Cisticola
- Species: C. brunnescens

Binomial name
- Cisticola brunnescens Heuglin, 1862

= Pectoral-patch cisticola =

Species of bird

The pectoral-patch cisticola (Cisticola brunnescens) is a species of bird in the family Cisticolidae. It is native to the Adamawa Massif, Gabon, the Congo and highlands of East Africa. Its natural habitats are damp or wet areas in upland grassland.

== Description ==
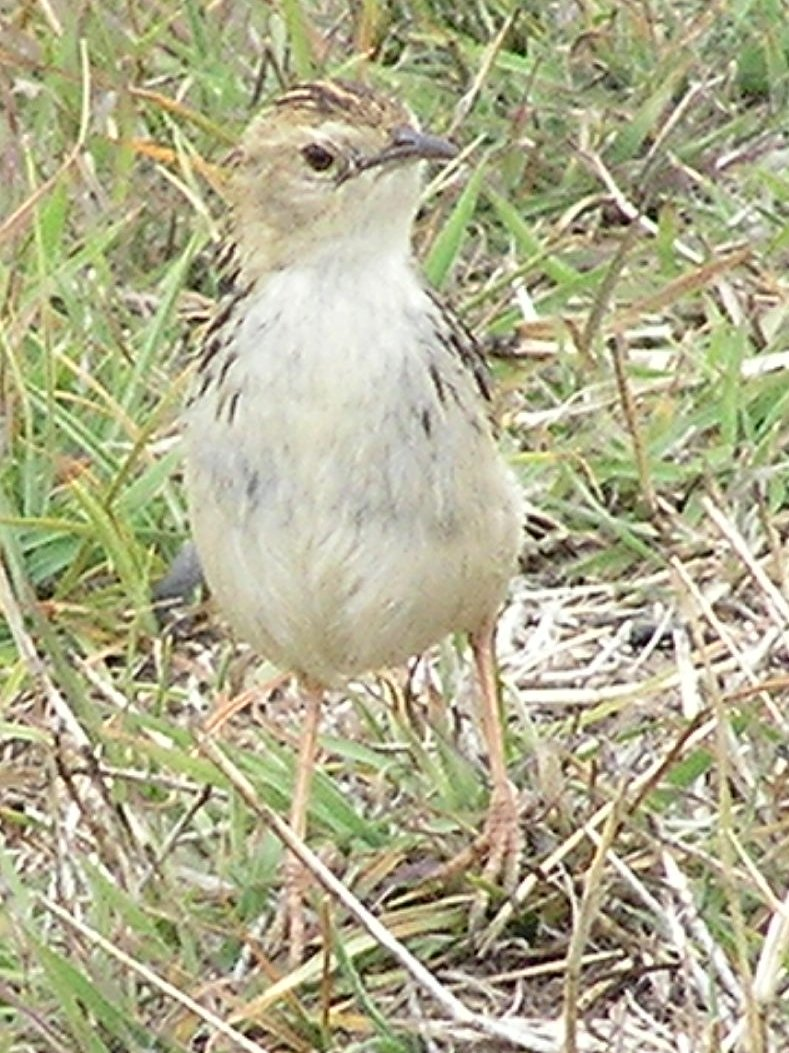
Pectoral-patch cisticola, Debre Berhan, Ethiopia, showing the pectoral patches.

At 9–10 cm this is a small, streak-backed cisticola with short or medium tail, which may get longer in the breeding season. It differs from the pale-crowned cisticola in having a pale rufous (not buff) crown and forehead in the breeding season. The pectoral patches become darker in the breeding season, but even then they may not be easy to see.

== Voice ==
The voice is stonechat-like in quality with harsh tssk tssk or szisk szisk notes given in display flight.
