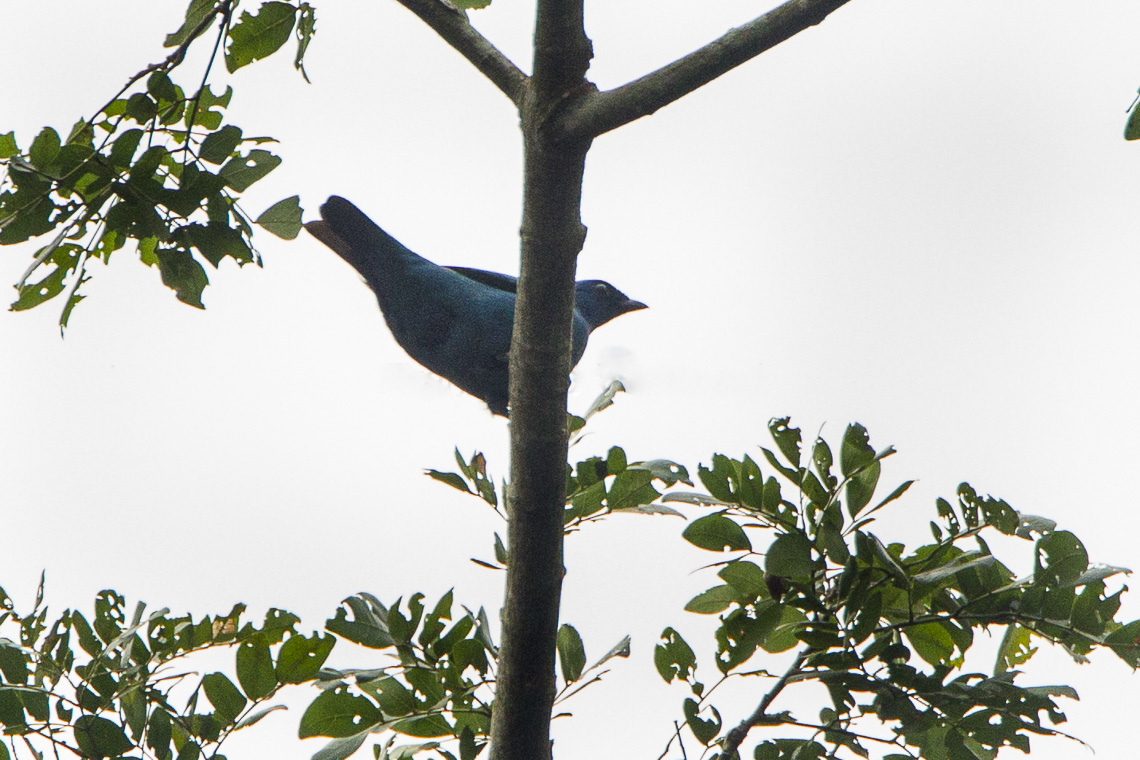

Conservation status
- Least Concern (IUCN 3.1)]

Scientific classification
- Kingdom: Animalia
- Phylum: Chordata
- Class: Aves
- Order: Passeriformes
- Family: Campephagidae
- Genus: Cyanograucalus; Hartlaub, 1861
- Species: C. azureus

Binomial name
- Cyanograucalus azureus (Cassin, 1852)

Synonyms
- Graucalus azureus (protoniem); Coracina azurea

= Blue cuckooshrike =

Species of bird

The blue cuckooshrike (Cyanograucalus azureus) is a species of bird in the Cuckooshrike family, Campephagidae. It is widespread across the African tropical rainforest, from Sierra Leone and Liberia to eastern and south-western Democratic Republic of Congo. Its natural habitats are subtropical or tropical dry forests and subtropical or tropical moist lowland forests.

This species was formerly placed in the genus Coracina. A molecular phylogenetic study published in 2010 found the genus Coracina was non-monophyletic. In the resulting reorganization to create monophyletic genera, the blue cuckooshrike is the only species placed in the resurrected genus Cyanograucalus.
