= Grant's bluebill =

Conservation status
- Least Concern (IUCN 3.1)

Scientific classification
- Kingdom: Animalia
- Phylum: Chordata
- Class: Aves
- Order: Passeriformes
- Family: Estrildidae
- Genus: Spermophaga
- Species: S. poliogenys

Binomial name
- Spermophaga poliogenys (Ogilvie-Grant, 1906)
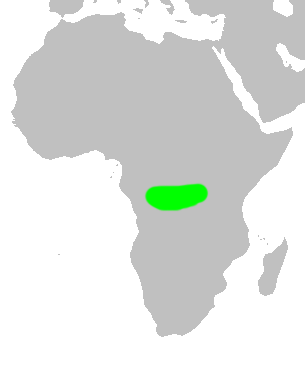
- Grant's Bluebill (Spermophaga poliogenys) habitat in Central Africa

Species of bird

Grant's bluebill (Spermophaga poliogenys) is a species of estrildid finch found in forests in central Africa in subtropical forests or in moist lowlands. It has an estimated global extent of occurrence of 350,000 km^{2}.

It is found in the Republic of Congo, the Democratic Republic of the Congo and Uganda. The IUCN has classified the species as being of least concern.

The common name of this species commemorates the British ornithologist Claude Henry Baxter Grant.
