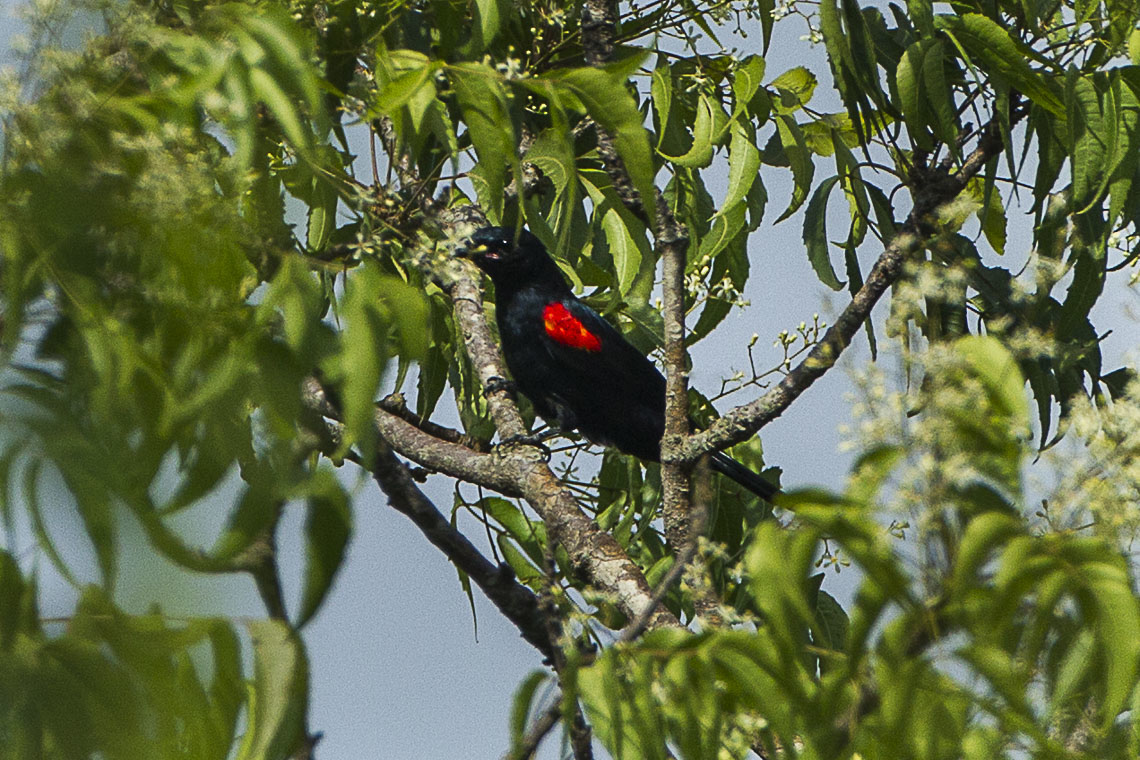

Conservation status
- Least Concern (IUCN 3.1)

Scientific classification
- Kingdom: Animalia
- Phylum: Chordata
- Class: Aves
- Order: Passeriformes
- Family: Campephagidae
- Genus: Campephaga
- Species: C. phoenicea

Binomial name
- Campephaga phoenicea (Latham, 1790)

= Red-shouldered cuckooshrike =

Species of bird

The red-shouldered cuckooshrike (Campephaga phoenicea) is a species of bird in the family Campephagidae.

It is widespread across the Sudan region and adjacent areas.

Its natural habitats are subtropical or tropical moist lowland forest and dry savanna.

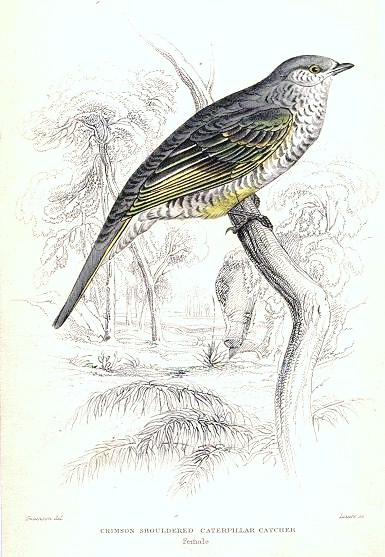
Female
