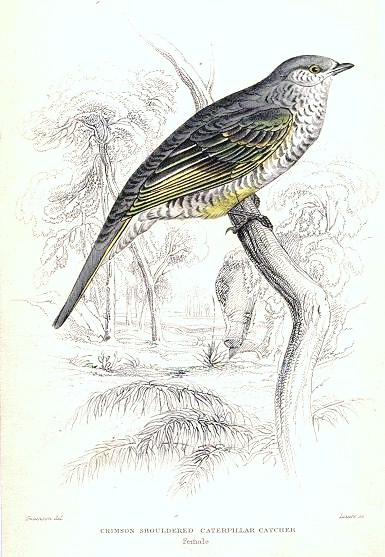
- Red-shouldered cuckooshrike (Campephaga phoenicea)

Scientific classification
- Kingdom: Animalia
- Phylum: Chordata
- Class: Aves
- Order: Passeriformes
- Family: Campephagidae
- Genus: Campephaga; Vieillot, 1816

Type species
- Campephaga flava Vieillot, 1817

= Campephaga =

Genus of birds

Campephaga is a genus of bird in the cuckoo-shrike family Campephagidae.

The genus contains four species:

- Black cuckooshrike (Campephaga flava)
- Petit's cuckooshrike (Campephaga petiti)
- Red-shouldered cuckooshrike (Campephaga phoenicea)
- Purple-throated cuckooshrike (Campephaga quiscalina)

The genus name is combination of two Greek words: kampe, meaning "caterpillar" and -phagos (from phagein) meaning "-eating".
