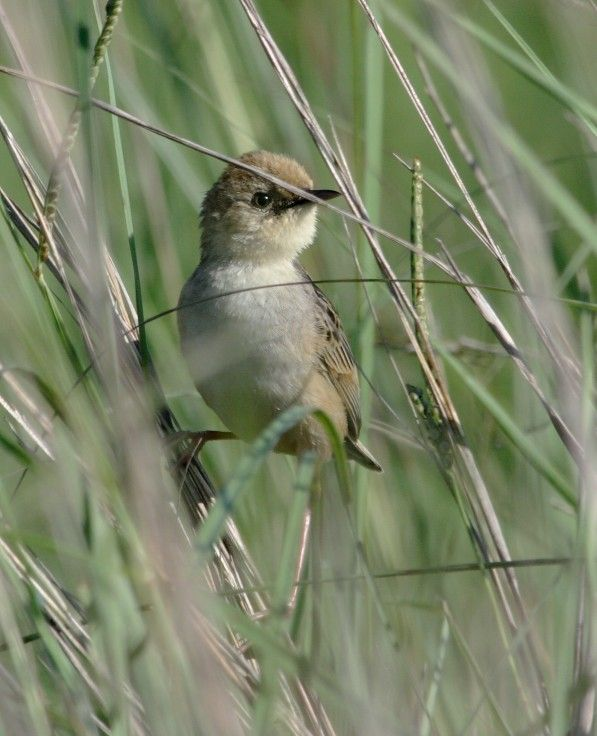
- Midmar Game Reserve, KwaZulu-Natal, South Africa.

Conservation status
- Least Concern (IUCN 3.1)

Scientific classification
- Kingdom: Animalia
- Phylum: Chordata
- Class: Aves
- Order: Passeriformes
- Family: Cisticolidae
- Genus: Cisticola
- Species: C. cinnamomeus

Binomial name
- Cisticola cinnamomeus Reichenow, 1904

= Pale-crowned cisticola =

Species of bird

The pale-crowned cisticola (Cisticola cinnamomeus) is a species of bird in the family Cisticolidae.

== Taxonomy ==
Cisticola cinnamomeus was split from Cisticola brunnescens (pectoral-patch cisticola); since 2000 it has been recognised as a separate species by most world bird-listing authorities.

== Distribution ==
It is found in Africa from eastern South Africa to Gabon and Tanzania.

== Habitat ==
Its natural habitats are damp or marshy areas in upland grassland.
