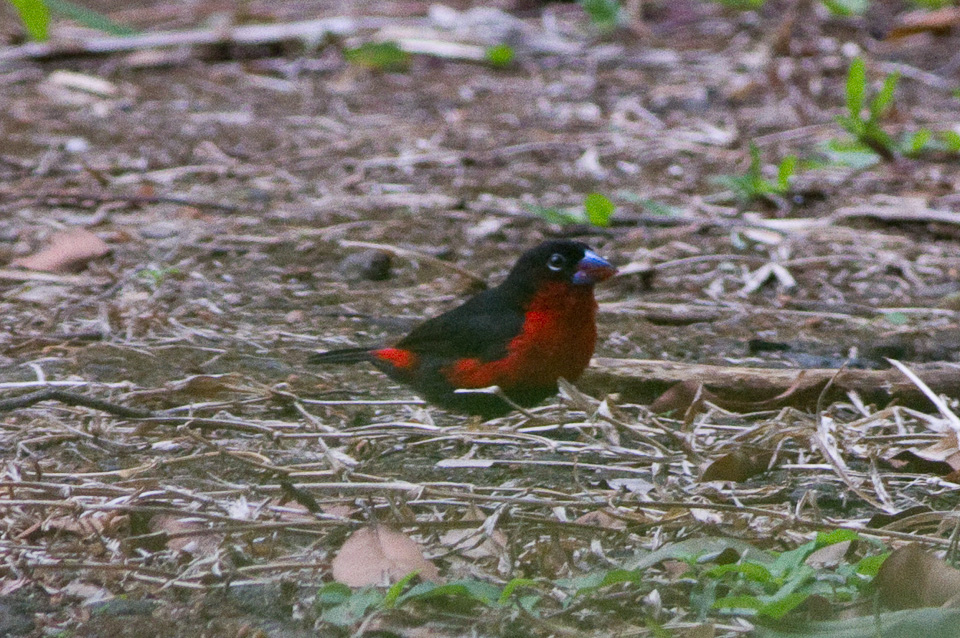

Conservation status
- Least Concern (IUCN 3.1)

Scientific classification
- Kingdom: Animalia
- Phylum: Chordata
- Class: Aves
- Order: Passeriformes
- Family: Estrildidae
- Genus: Spermophaga
- Species: S. haematina

Binomial name
- Spermophaga haematina (Vieillot, 1807)

= Western bluebill =

Species of bird

The western bluebill (Spermophaga haematina) is a common species of estrildid finch found in Africa. It has an estimated global extent of occurrence of 1,900,000 km^{2}.

It is native to the Guineo-Congolian region, as well as the Jos Plateau and from western Gambia to Guinea Bissau.

The IUCN has classified the species as being of least concern.

The male of this species has a red tipped blue bill, and red flanks from the chin to the breast. They also have a characteristic white-blue eye ring. The female has a blue bill with not as much red at the tip, and face color of either black, washed red or maroon.
