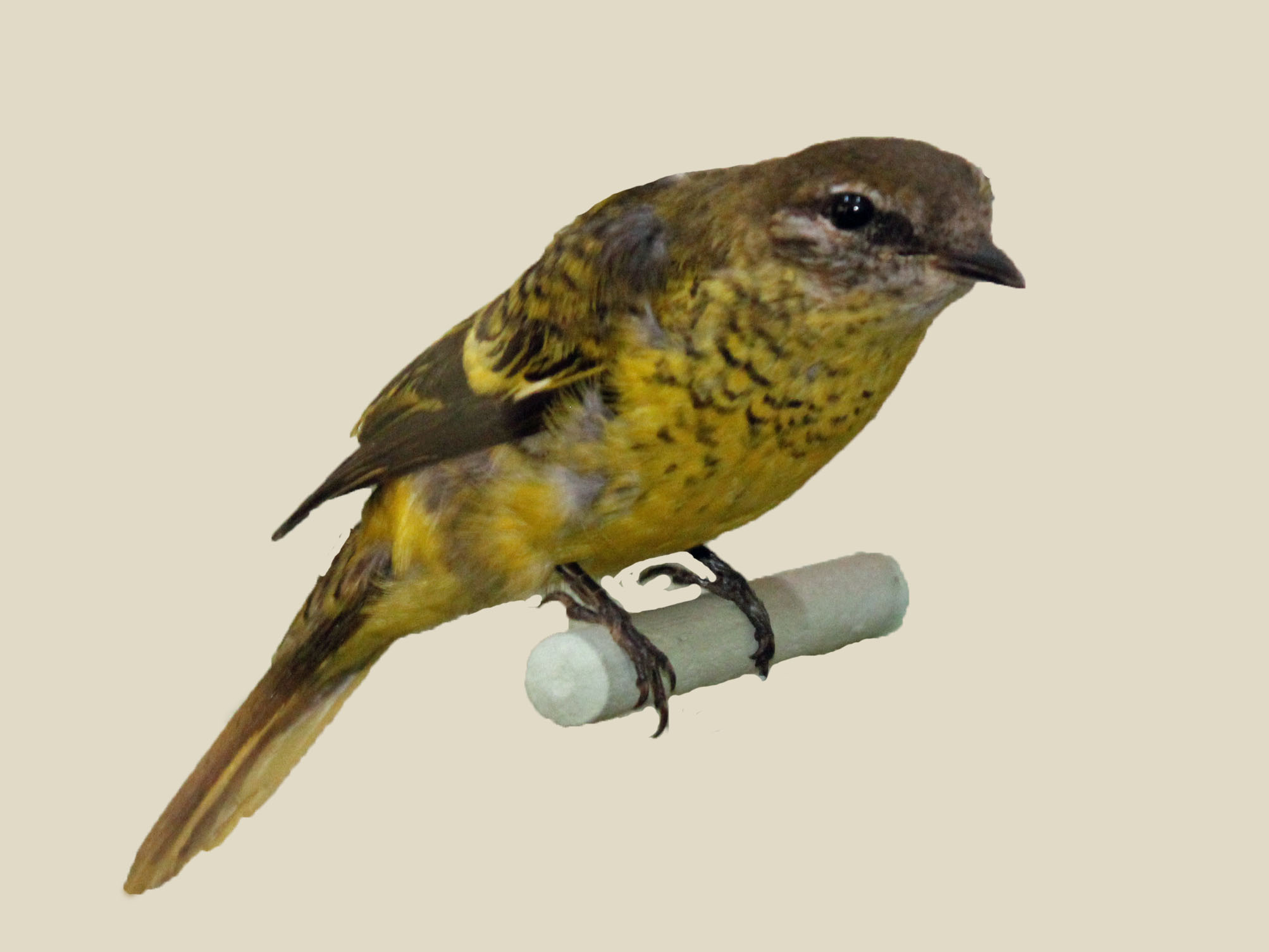
- specimen at Nairobi National Museum
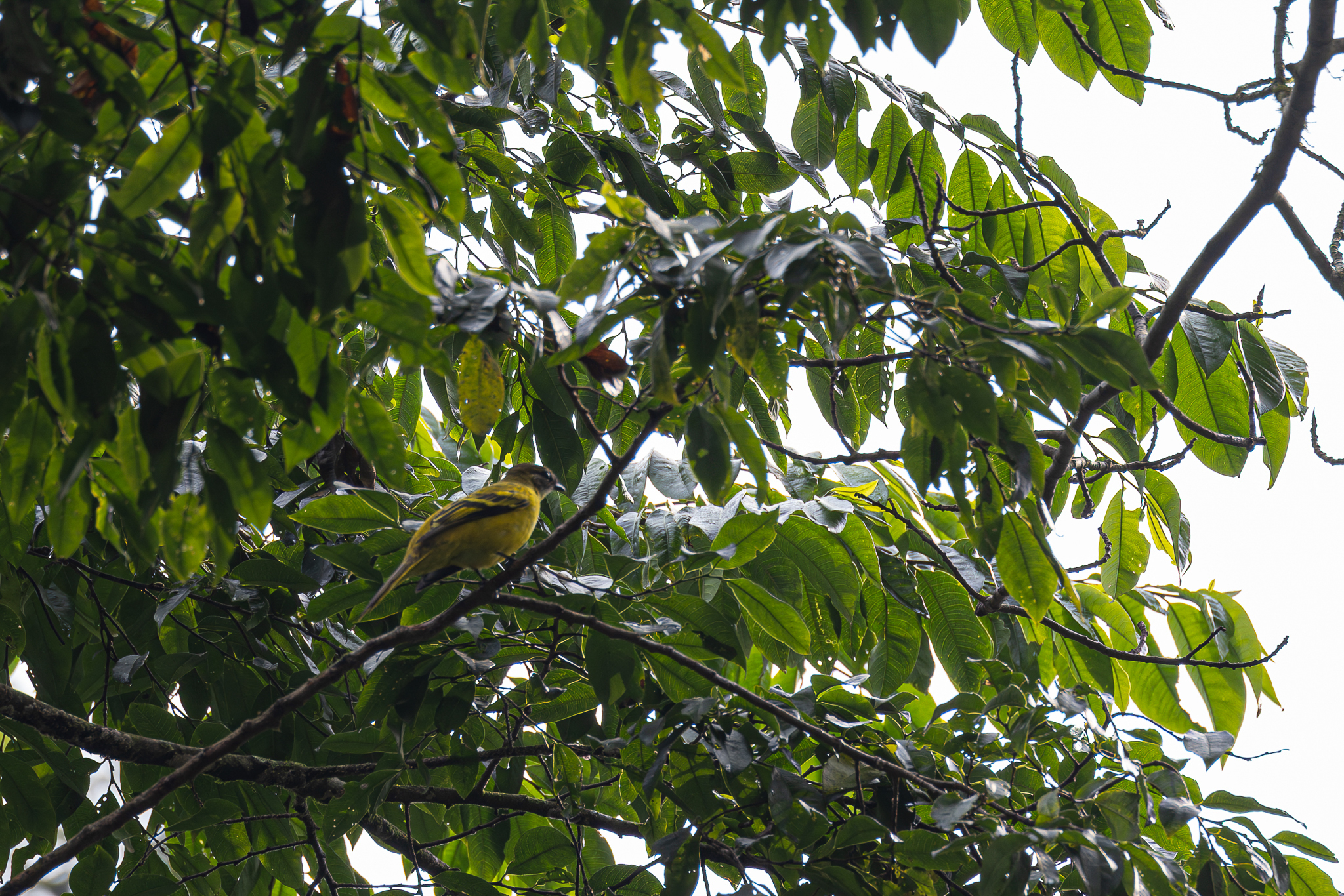

Conservation status
- Least Concern (IUCN 3.1)

Scientific classification
- Kingdom: Animalia
- Phylum: Chordata
- Class: Aves
- Order: Passeriformes
- Family: Campephagidae
- Genus: Campephaga
- Species: C. petiti

Binomial name
- Campephaga petiti Oustalet, 1884

= Petit's cuckooshrike =

Species of bird

Petit's cuckooshrike (Campephaga petiti) is a species of bird in the family Campephagidae. It is found in Angola, Cameroon, Republic of the Congo, Democratic Republic of the Congo, Gabon, Kenya, Nigeria, and Uganda. Its natural habitats are subtropical or tropical moist lowland forest and subtropical or tropical moist montane forest.
