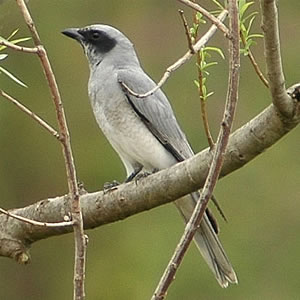
- Black-faced cuckooshrike Coracina novaehollandiae

Scientific classification
- Kingdom: Animalia
- Phylum: Chordata
- Class: Aves
- Order: Passeriformes
- Infraorder: Corvides
- Family: Campephagidae; Vigors, 1825

Genera
- See text

= Cuckooshrike =

Family of birds

The cuckooshrikes and allies in the family Campephagidae are small to medium-sized passerine bird species found in the subtropical and tropical Africa, Asia and Australasia. The 107 species are divided into 11 genera. The woodshrikes (Tephrodornis) were often considered to be in this family but are now placed in their own family, Vangidae, along with the philentomas and the flycatcher-shrikes. Another genus, Chlamydochaera, which has one species, the black-breasted fruithunter, was often placed in this family but has now been shown to be a thrush (Turdidae).

== Taxonomy ==
Cuckooshrikes are not closely related to either the cuckoos or to the shrikes; the name probably comes from the grey colour of many of the cuckooshrikes. Some of the species also bear a superficial resemblance to cuckoos, and have a similar undulating flight. The grey colouration has led to one of their other names, the greybird. In some parts of the world they have also been known as caterpillar-birds, a name derived from their diet. Although unsuspected earlier, DNA studies have suggested they may be related to the Old World orioles (Oriolidae), although they differ strongly in some morphological characteristics (such as skull morphology and the arrangements of feathers on the wing).

A molecular phylogenetic study of the Campephegidae published in 2010 found that the speciose genus Coracina was non-monophyletic. In the resulting reorganization to create monophyletic genera five genera were resurrected. A large group of species previously assigned to Coracina was moved to Edolisoma and a group of Asian and Indian Ocean cuckooshrikes was moved to Lalage. The African cuckooshrikes were moved to Ceblepyris, and three species were placed in monotypic genera: McGregor's cuckooshrike was moved to Malindangia, the pygmy cuckooshrike was moved to Celebesica and the blue cuckooshrike was moved to Cyanograucalus.

== Description ==
Overall the cuckooshrikes are medium to small arboreal birds, generally long and slender. The smallest species is the small minivet at 16 cm (6.3 in) and 6–12 g (0.21–0.42 oz), while the largest is the south Melanesian cuckooshrike at 35 cm (14 in) and 180 grams (0.40 pounds). They are predominantly greyish with white and black, although the minivets are brightly coloured in red, yellow and black, and the blue cuckooshrike of central Africa is all-over glossy blue. The four cuckooshrikes in the genus Campephaga exhibit sexual dimorphism, with males that have glossy black plumage and bright red or yellow wattles, the females having more subdued olive-green plumage.

== Habitat ==
Of the 107 species of cuckooshrike, the majority are forest birds. Some species are restricted to primary forest, like the New Caledonian cuckooshrike, others are able to use more disturbed forest. Around eleven species use much more open habitat, one Australian species, the ground cuckooshrike being found in open plains and scrubland with few trees.

== Behaviour ==
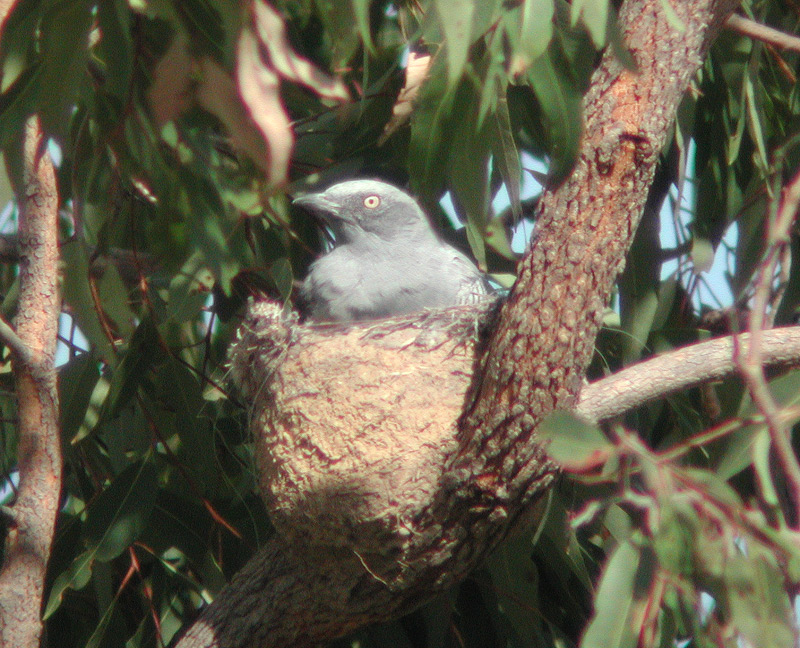
Nesting ground cuckooshrike

The 'true' cuckooshrikes are usually found singly, in pairs, and in small family groups, whereas the minivets, flycatcher-shrikes and wood-shrikes more frequently form small flocks. There is a considerable amount of variation within the family as a whole with regard to calls, some call very infrequently and some, principally the minivets, are extremely vocal.

These are mainly insectivorous, and will take large hairy caterpillars. They have also been recorded eating small vertebrates, and some fruit, seeds and other plant matter.

Information about the breeding of this family is incomplete, with many species having never been studied. In all the species studied the cuckooshrikes are territorial; in species that do not migrate these territories are maintained year-round. Cuckooshrikes are monogamous, with the pair bonds apparently lasting throughout the year. Only one instance of non-monogamous breeding has been recorded, an instance of polygyny in white-winged trillers in Australia, where one male aided two females in raising their young. Several species of cuckooshrike exhibit cooperative breeding. About four blotchy white, green or blue eggs are laid in a cup nest in a tree. Incubation is about two weeks.

== List of genera ==
- - Pericrocotus: minivets, 14 species
  - - - Ceblepyris: 5 species
      - Coracina: 27 species
    - - - Campephaga: 4 species
        - Lobotos: 2 species
      - - Campochaera: Golden cuckooshrike
        - - Malindangia: McGregor's cuckooshrike
          - - Lalage: 20 species
            - - Edolisoma: 31 species
              - - Celebesica: Pygmy cuckooshrike
                - Cyanograucalus: Blue cuckooshrike

Phylogeny of the genera

The family contains 107 species divided in 11 genera:

- Pericrocotus – minivets (14 species)
- Ceblepyris – cuckooshrikes (5 species)
- Coracina – cuckooshrikes (27 species)
- Campephaga – cuckooshrikes (4 species)
- Lobotos – wattled cuckooshrikes (2 species)
- Campochaera – golden cuckooshrike
- Malindangia – McGregor's cuckooshrike
- Edolisoma – cuckooshrikes and cicadabirds (31 species)
- Celebesica – pygmy cuckooshrike
- Cyanograucalus – blue cuckooshrike
- Lalage – trillers and cuckooshrikes (20 species)
