= Yap tropical dry forests =

Terrestrial ecoregion in Micronesia

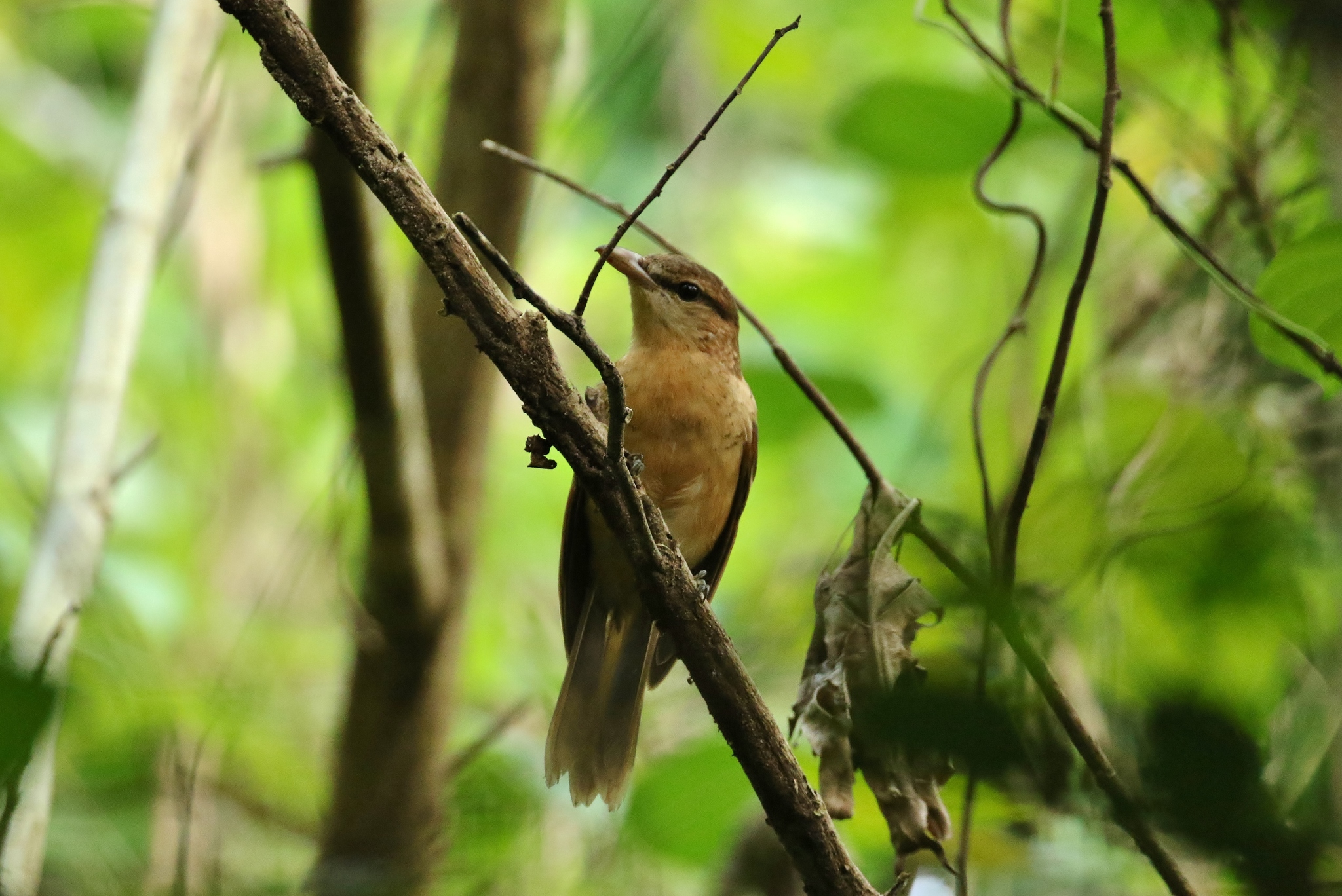
- Yap cicadabird (Edolisoma nesiotis) on Yap

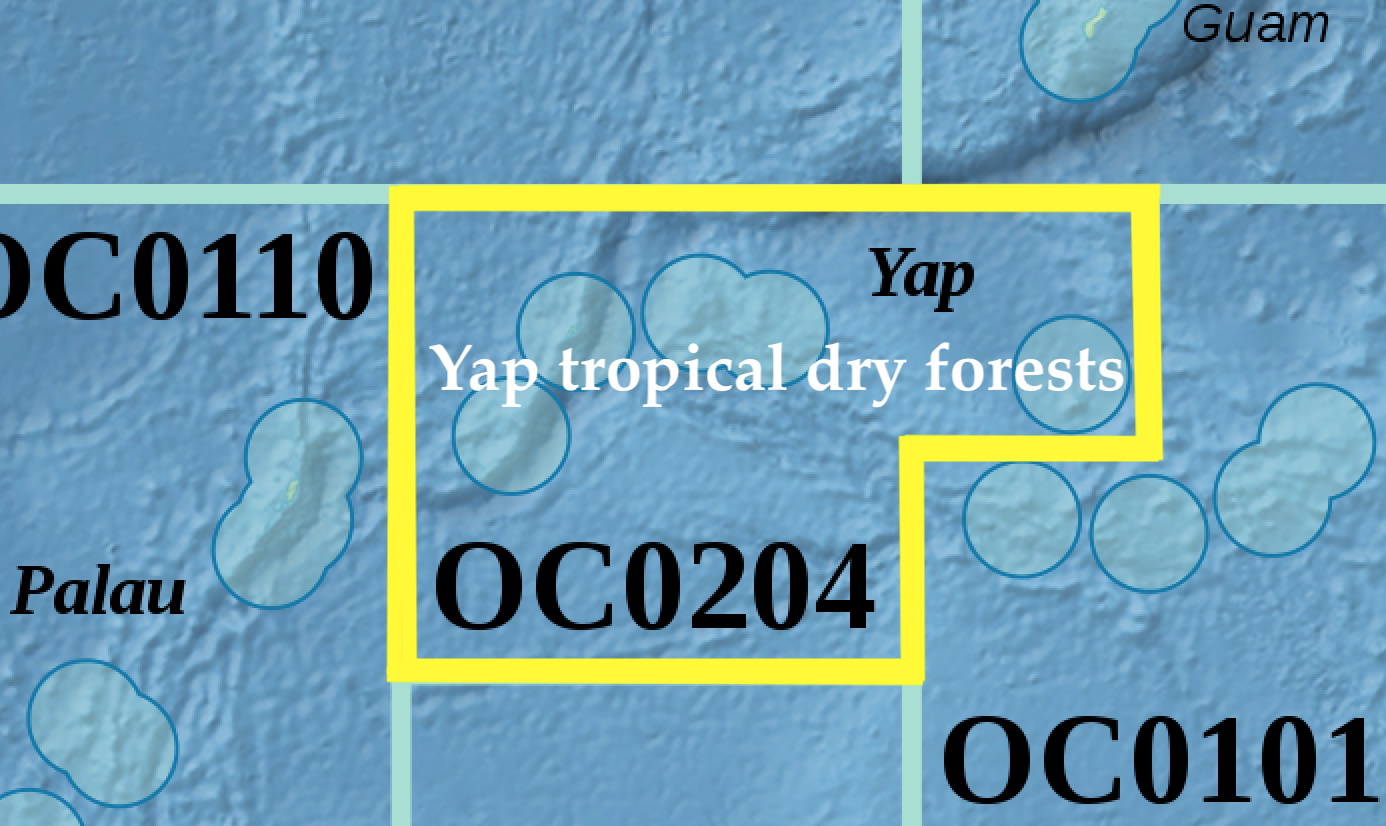
- Map of the Yap tropical dry forests

Ecology
- Realm: Oceanian
- Biome: tropical and subtropical moist broadleaf forests

Geography
- Area: 102 km^{2} (39 mi^{2})
- Country: Federated States of Micronesia
- State: Yap

Conservation
- Conservation status: Critical/endangered
- Protected: 0%

The Yap tropical dry forests is a tropical and subtropical dry broadleaf forests ecoregion in Micronesia. It includes the Yap Islands and neighboring atolls in the Federated States of Micronesia.

== Geography ==
The ecoregion covers the Yap Islands, an island group in the western Caroline Islands. The islands are east of Palau and southeast of the Mariana Islands. The group has four central islands, Yap, Gagil-Tomil, and Maap, and Rumung, which are separated by narrow channels. The highest elevation is Mount Taabiywol (178 m (584 ft)) on Yap Island. The islands are surrounded by a lagoon and an enclosing barrier reef.

It also includes the atolls of Ulithi to the northeast and Ngulu to the southwest.

== Climate ==
The climate is tropical. Average annual temperature is 27º C with little seasonal variation. Average annual rainfall ranges from 2,250 to 3,400 mm, and is highly seasonal, with a distinct dry season from January through March and heavy rains from May through November. The islands are subject to typhoons.

== Flora ==
Prior to human habitation, the natural vegetation likely consisted mostly of deciduous broadleaf forests. Humans have altered the islands' vegetation, and converted the lowland forests to farms, plantations, and tree gardens.

The remaining natural vegetation consists of upland forests, upland savanna, freshwater swamps, and mangroves.

The upland forests are mostly secondary forests of low stature, with no stratification. The canopy layer has a diverse mix of tree species including Celtis sp., Buchanania engleriana, Campnosperma brevipetiolata, Trichospermum ikutai, Garcinia rumiyo, Pentaphalangium volkensii, Terminalia catappa, Planchonella obovata, Pangium edule, Aidia cochinchinensis, and Eurya japonica. The understory shrub layer includes species of Psychotria, Crateva, Streblus, Glochidion, Leea, Hibiscus, Polyscias, and Ixora. The upland forest is denser and forms a closed canopy in better-watered areas and on deeper soils, and is much more open on exposed or rocky slopes. These secondary forests include a mix of native and cultivated species.

The ecoregion's endemic species are mostly from genera also found on Palau, and include Drypetes yapensis, Drypetes carolinensis, Trichospermum ikutai, Hedyotis fruticosa, Timonius albus, and Casearia cauliflora. The shrub Myrtella bennigseniana is found only in savannas on Yap and Guam.

== Fauna ==
Yap is home to four endemic bird species, the Yap monarch (Monarcha godeffroyi), Yap olive white-eye (Zosterops oleagineus) plain white-eye (Zosterops hypolais), and Yap cicadabird (Edolisoma nesiotis). The Yap cicadabird is sometimes considered a subspecies of the common cicadabird (Edolisoma tenuirostre). Limited-range species include the white-throated ground dove (Alopecoenas xanthonurus), Micronesian imperial pigeon (Ducula oceanica), Micronesian myzomela (Myzomela rubratra), and Micronesian starling (Aplonis opaca). A race of the Indo-Pacific common moorhen (Gallinula chloropus orientalis) is found on the islands.

The Yap flying fox is endemic to the islands; it considered a subspecies of the Palau flying fox (Pteropus pelewensis yapensis) or a separate species (Pteropus yapensis). A subspecies of the Mariana flying fox (Pteropus mariannus ulthiensis) is endemic to Ulithi.

== Conservation and threats ==
The islanders practice a traditional form of Agroforestry in tree gardens. These managed forests are composed of a mix of species, mostly introduced, which includes coconut palm (Cocos nucifera), breadfruit, betel nut, papaya, banana, cassava, two types of taro, and a variety of medicinal and ornamental plants.

The native plants and animals suffer from habitat loss. The introduced Polynesian rat (Rattus exulans) and brown tree snake (Boiga irregularis) prey heavily on native birds.

== Protected areas ==
There are no formal protected areas on Yap. Land is privately owned or managed communally, with exploitation of natural resources regulated through customary management.
