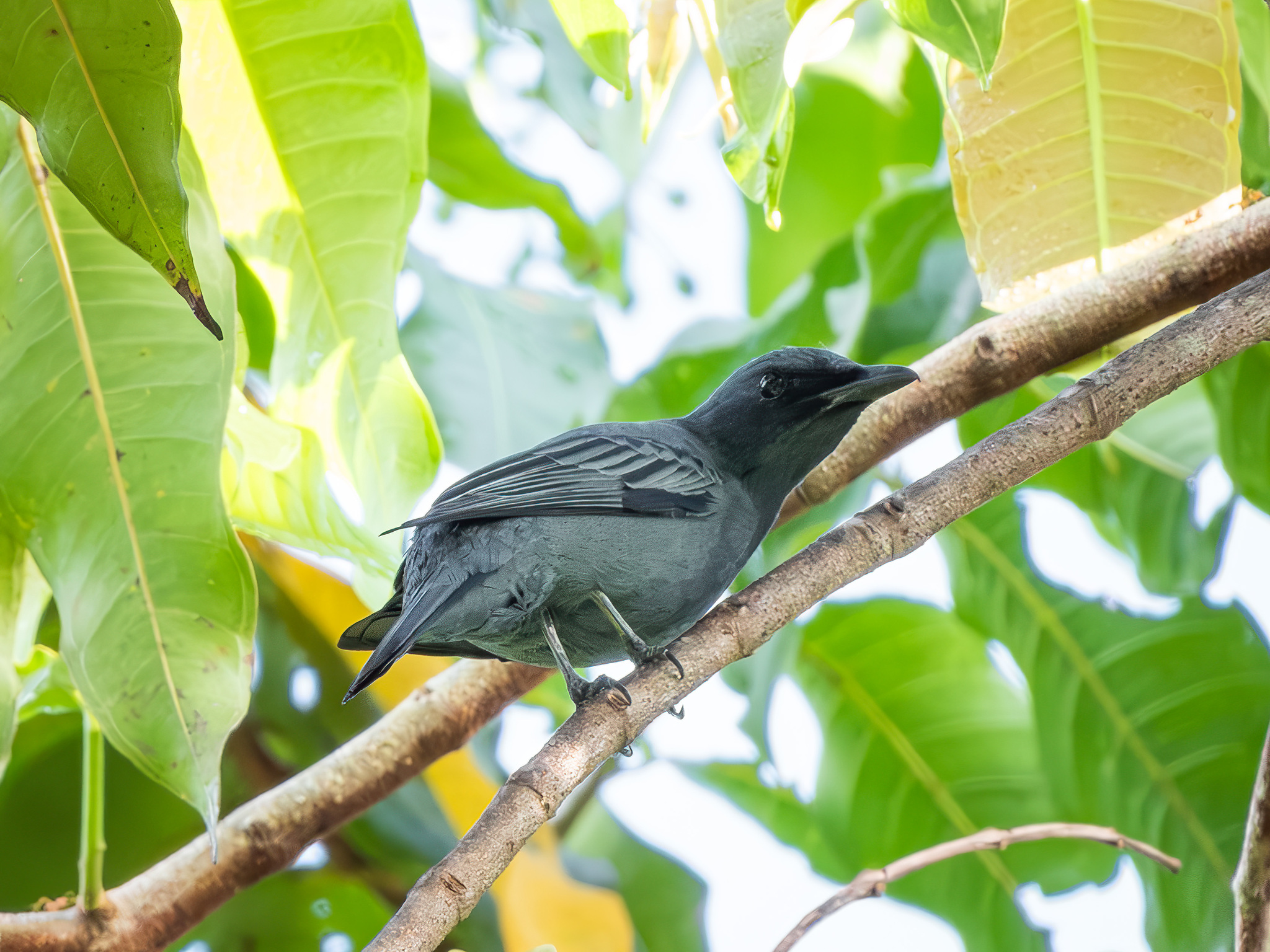
- Male (ssp. grayi)
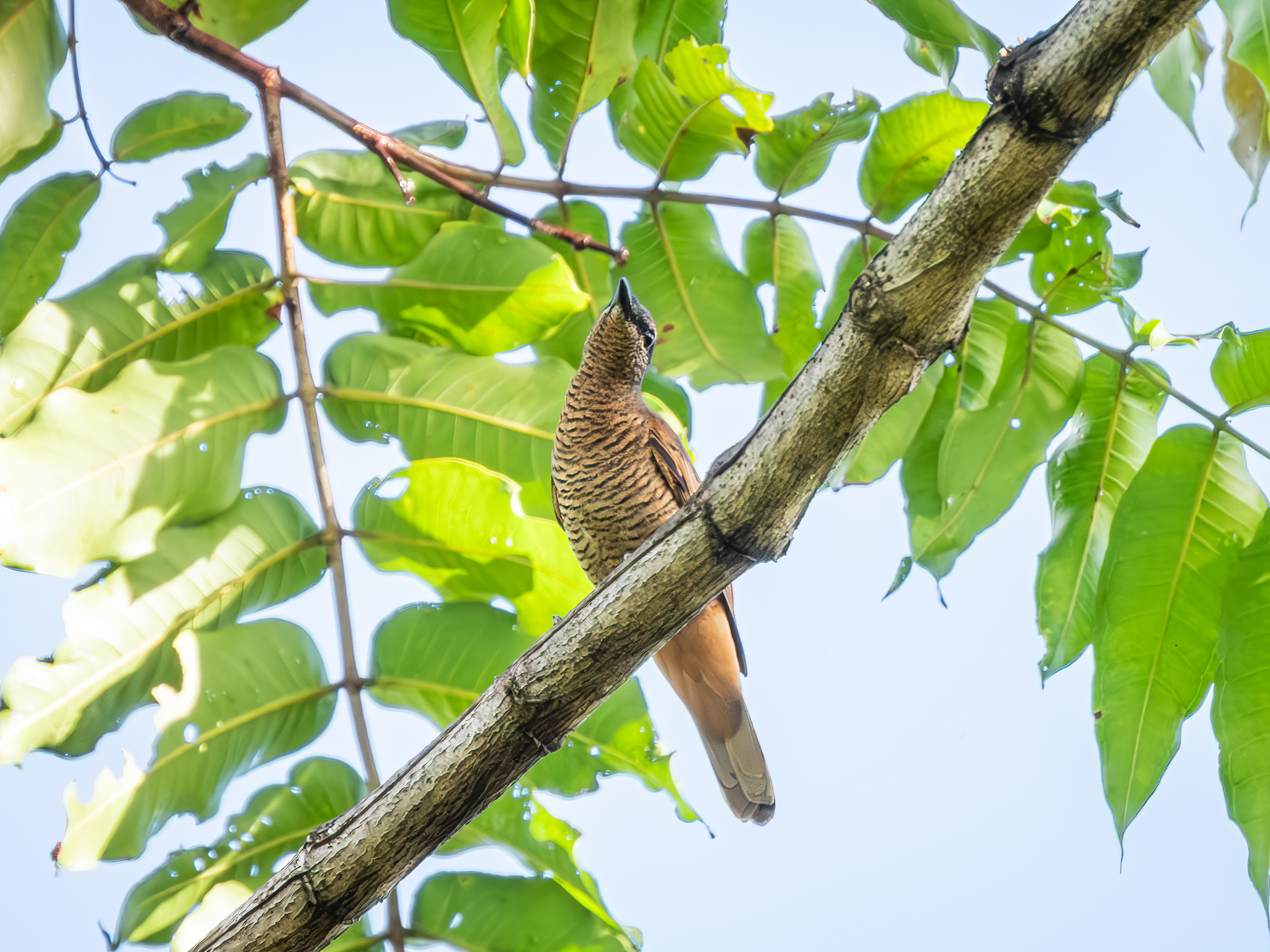
- Female (ssp. grayi)

Conservation status
- Least Concern (IUCN 3.1)

Scientific classification
- Kingdom: Animalia
- Phylum: Chordata
- Class: Aves
- Order: Passeriformes
- Family: Campephagidae
- Genus: Edolisoma
- Species: E. grayi

Binomial name
- Edolisoma grayi Salvadori, 1879

= North Moluccan cicadabird =

Species of bird

The north Moluccan cicadabird (Edolisoma grayi) is a passerine bird in the family Campephagidae that is found on Halmahera, the Bacan Islands, the Tukangbesi Islands and the island of Morotai in the northern Moluccas Islands of Indonesia. The species was formerly considered to be conspecific with the common cicadabird, now renamed the Sahul cicadabird.

== Taxonomy ==
The north Moluccan cicadabird was formally described in 1861 by the English zoologist George Gray based on a specimen that had been collected on the island of Bacon which lies southwest of Halmahera in Indonesia. Gray coined the binomial name Campephaga melanotis. In 1879 the Italian zoologist Tommaso Salvadori coined the replacement name Edolisoma grayi as Gray's name was pre-occupied by Graucalus melanotis that had been introduced by John Gould in 1838. Gould's Graucalus melanotis is now considered to be a junior synonym of a subspecies of the black-faced cuckooshrike Coracina novaehollandiae melanops (Latham, 1801). The north Moluccan cicadabird was formerly treated as conspecific with the common cicadabird (now renamed the Sahul cicadabird) (Edolisoma tenuirostre). It was elevated to species status based on differences in plumage and vocalization combined with the results of a molecular genetic study published in 2018. The genetic study found that the north Moluccan cicadabird was sister to the Sula cicadabird (Edolisoma suma).

Two subspecies are recognised.

- E. g. pererratum Hartert, EJO, 1918 – Tukangbesi Islands (southeast of southeast Sulawesi)
- E. g. grayi Salvadori, 1879 – Morotai to Bacan Islands (north Moluccas)
