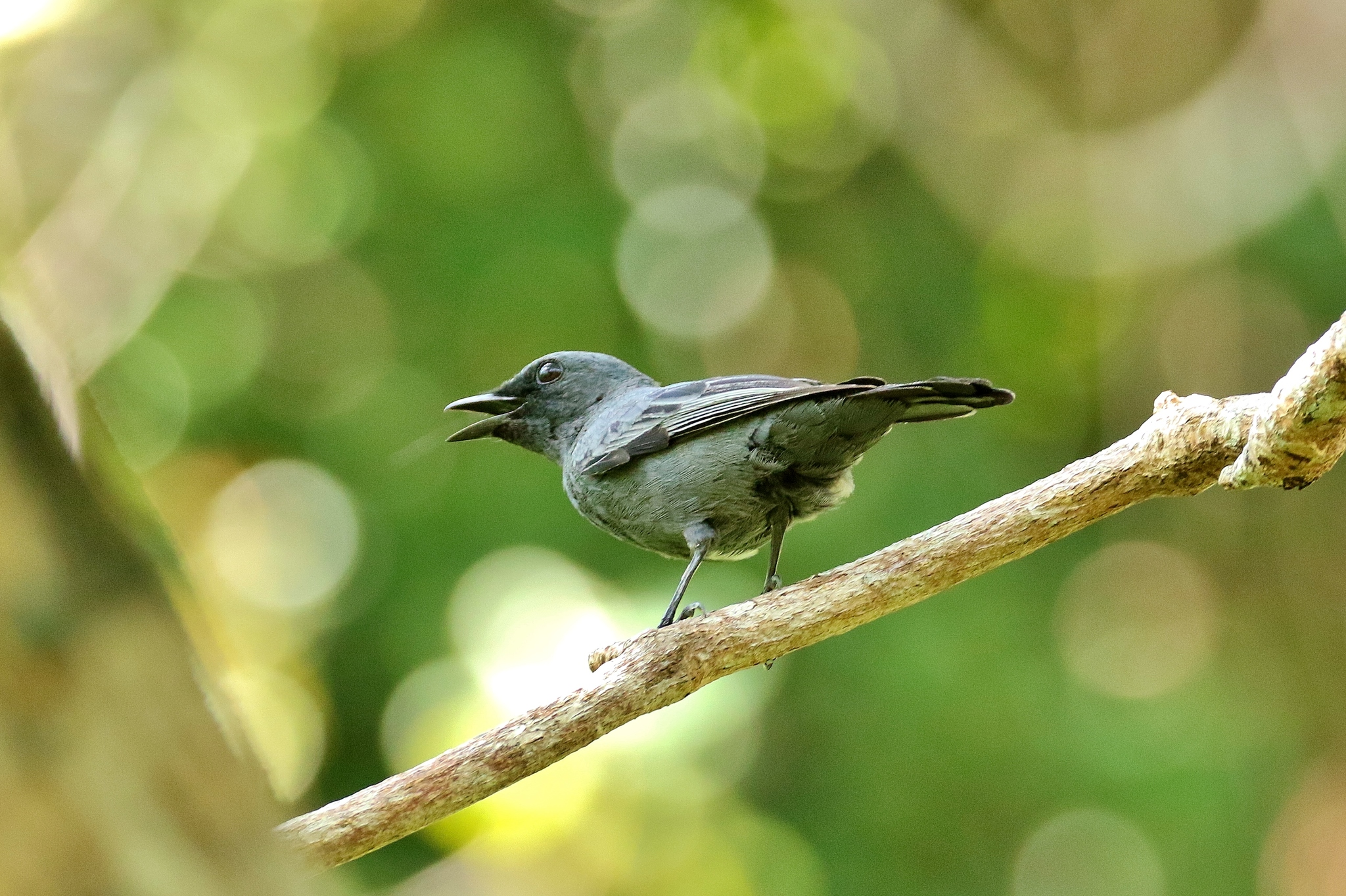

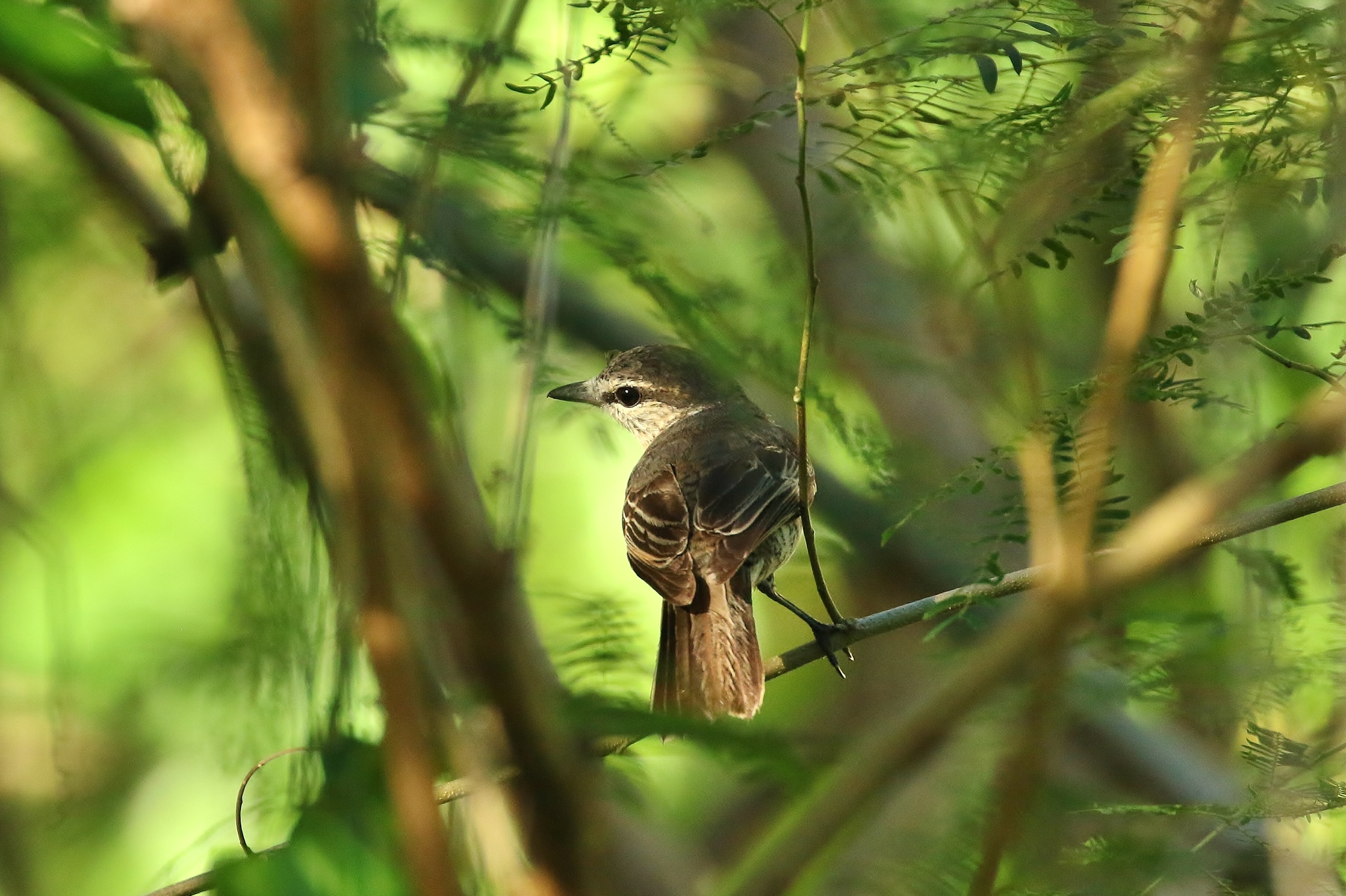

Conservation status
- Least Concern (IUCN 3.1)

Scientific classification
- Kingdom: Animalia
- Phylum: Chordata
- Class: Aves
- Order: Passeriformes
- Family: Campephagidae
- Genus: Edolisoma
- Species: E. monacha

Binomial name
- Edolisoma monacha (Hartlaub & Finsch, 1872)

Synonyms
- Coracina monacha; Coracina tenuirostris monacha

= Palau cicadabird =

Species of bird

The Palau cicadabird (Edolisoma monacha) is a species of bird in the family Campephagidae. It is endemic to Palau. It was previously considered conspecific with the common cicadabird. Its natural habitat is subtropical or tropical moist lowland forest.
