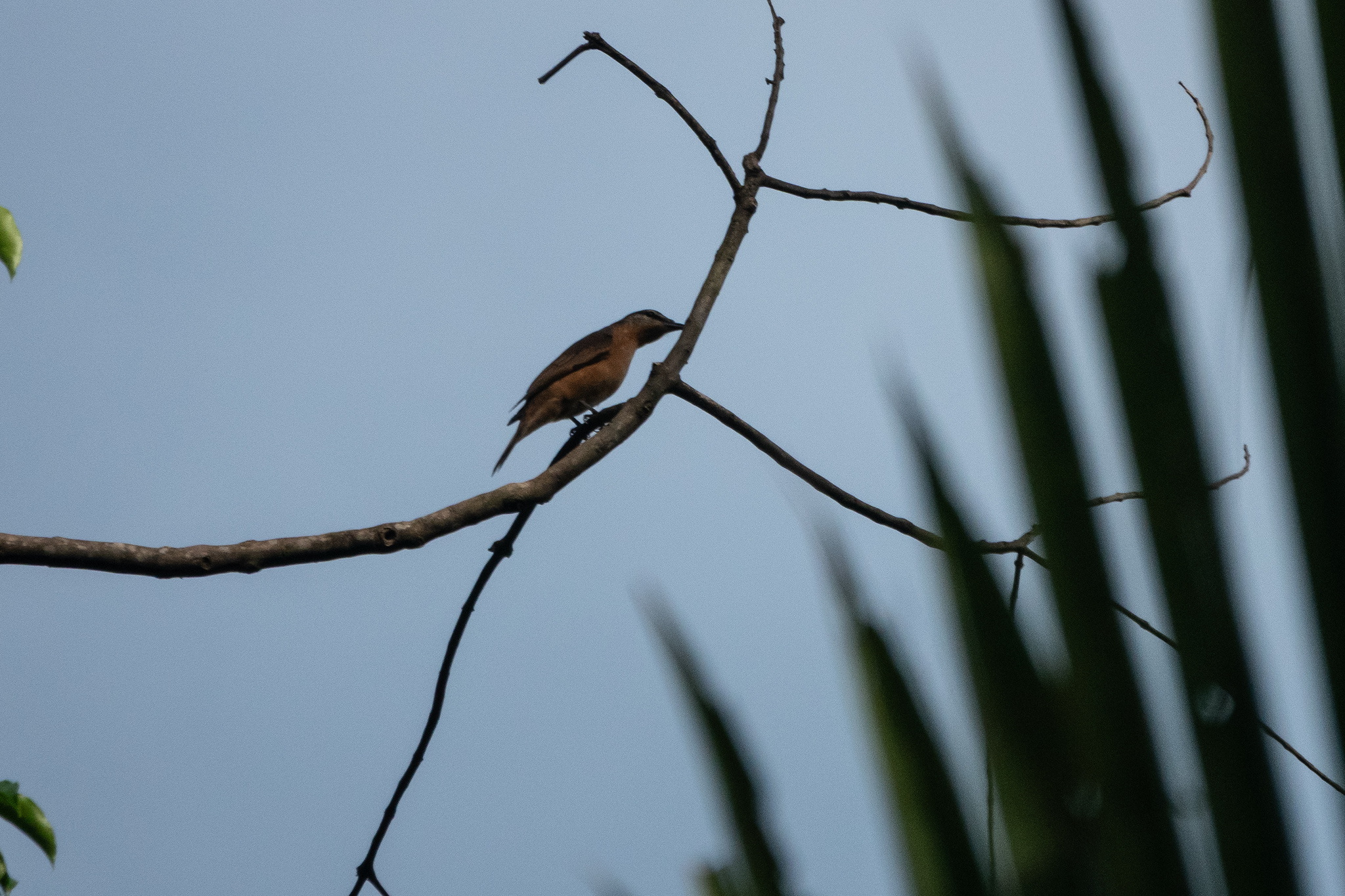

Conservation status
- Least Concern (IUCN 3.1)

Scientific classification
- Kingdom: Animalia
- Phylum: Chordata
- Class: Aves
- Order: Passeriformes
- Family: Campephagidae
- Genus: Edolisoma
- Species: E. remotum

Binomial name
- Edolisoma remotum Sharpe, 1878

Synonyms
- Coracina remota; Coracina tenuirostris remota

= Bismarck cicadabird =

Species of bird

The Bismarck cicadabird (Edolisoma remotum) is a species of bird in the family Campephagidae. It is endemic to islands in the Bismarck Archipelago. It was previously considered to be conspecific with the common cicadabird (E. tenuirostre).

Four subspecies are recognised:

- E. r. remotum Sharpe, 1878 – New Hanover Island, New Ireland, Dyaul Island (south of northwest New Ireland) and Feni Islands (east of southeast New Ireland; northeast Bismarck Archipelago)
- E. r. matthiae Sibley, 1946 – Mussau Island and Emirau Island (east of Mussau Island, St Matthias Islands, central north Bismarck Archipelago)
- E. r. rooki Rothschild & Hartert, EJO, 1914 – Umboi Island (west of New Britain, southwest Bismarck Archipelago)
- E. r. heinrothi Stresemann, 1922 – New Britain and Lolobau Island (north of east New Britain; southeast Bismarck Archipelago)

Its natural habitat is subtropical or tropical moist lowland forests.
