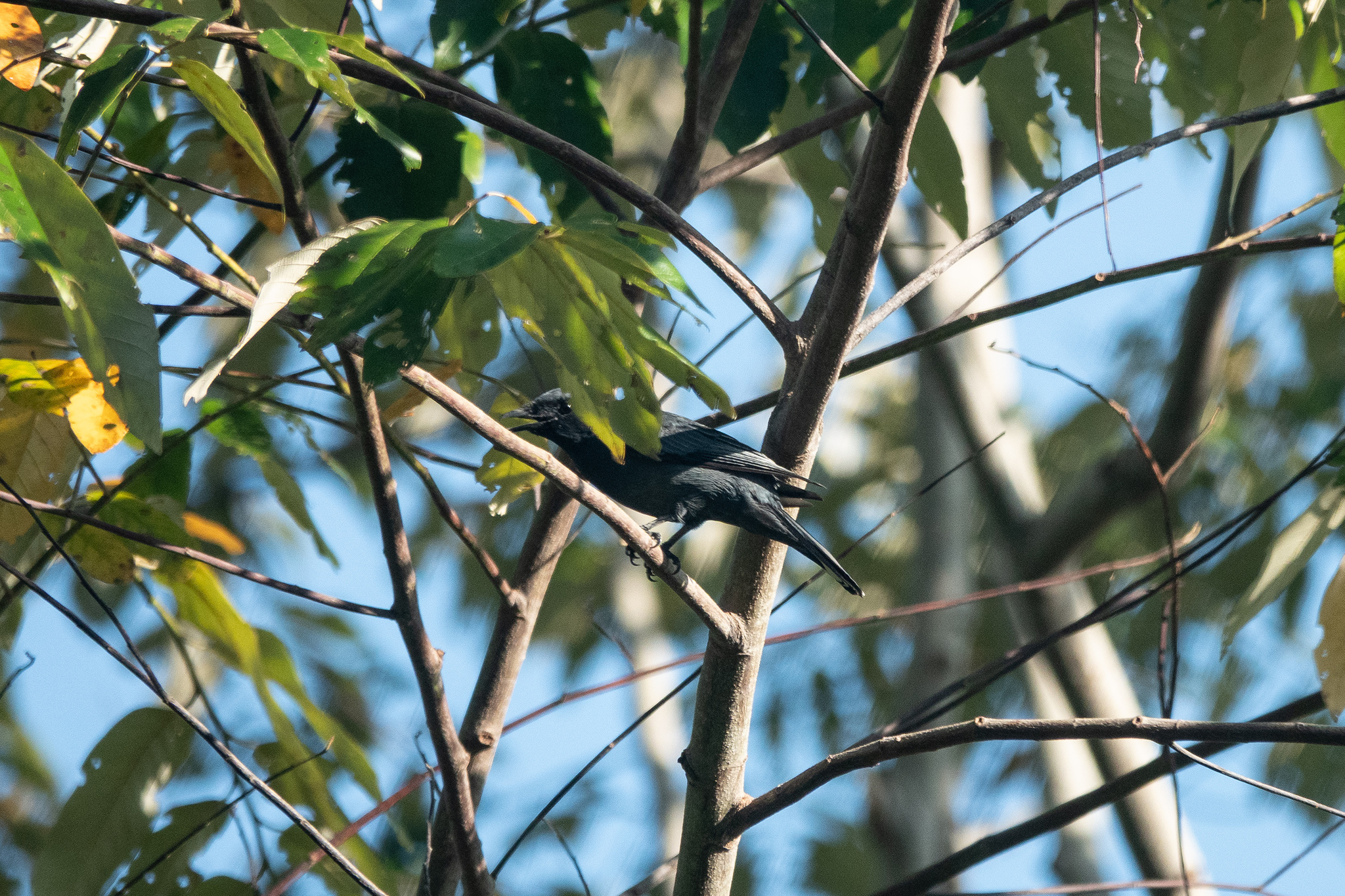
- Male
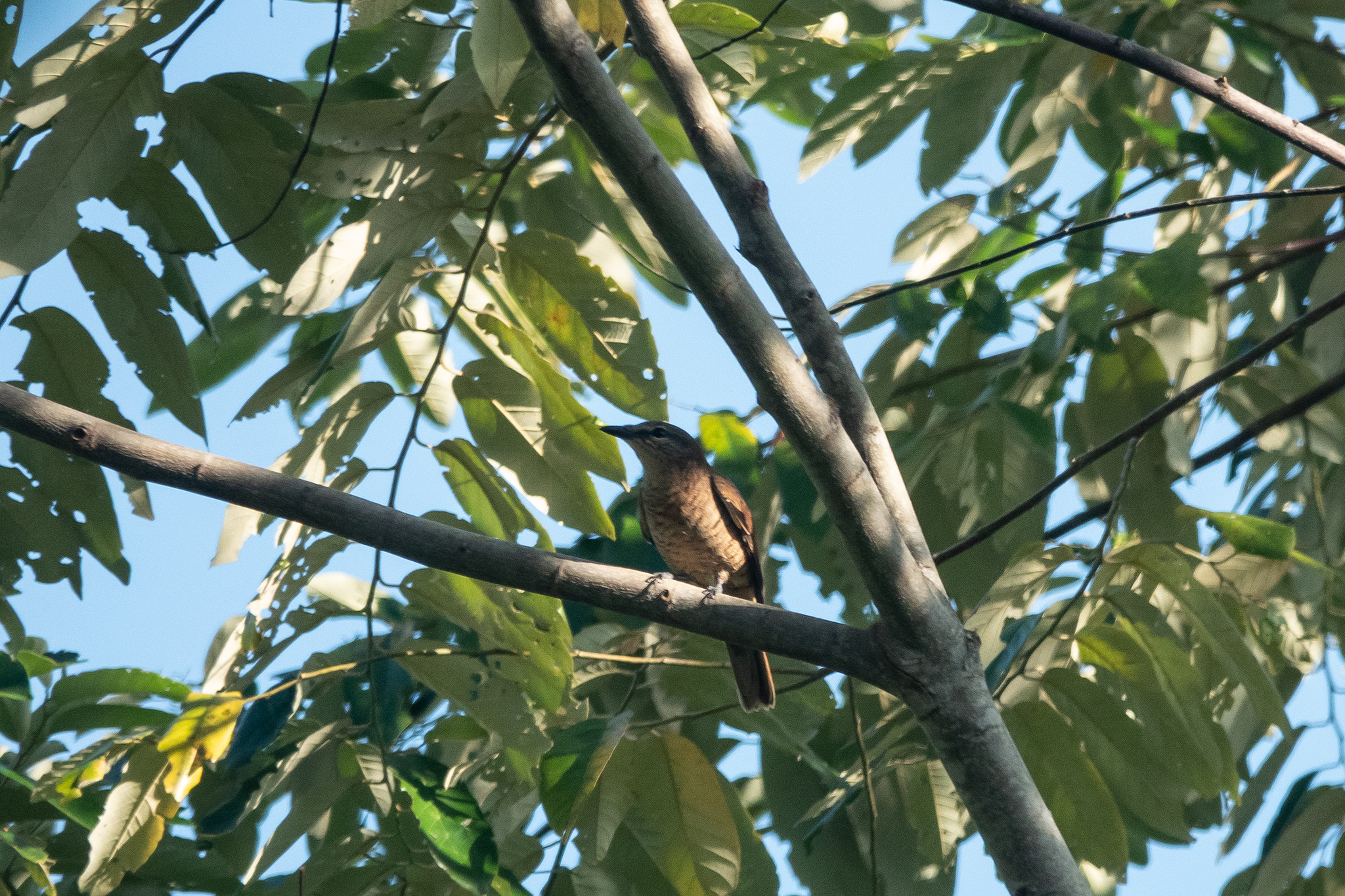
- Female

Scientific classification
- Kingdom: Animalia
- Phylum: Chordata
- Class: Aves
- Order: Passeriformes
- Family: Campephagidae
- Genus: Edolisoma
- Species: E. admiralitatis

Binomial name
- Edolisoma admiralitatis Rothschild & Hartert, 1914

Synonyms
- Coracina admiralitatis; Coracina tenuirostris admiralitatis

= Admiralty cicadabird =

Species of bird

The Admiralty cicadabird or Manus cicadabird (Edolisoma admiralitatis) is a species of bird in the family Campephagidae. It is endemic to the Admiralty Islands. It was previously considered conspecific with the common cicadabird.

Its natural habitat is subtropical or tropical moist lowland forest.
