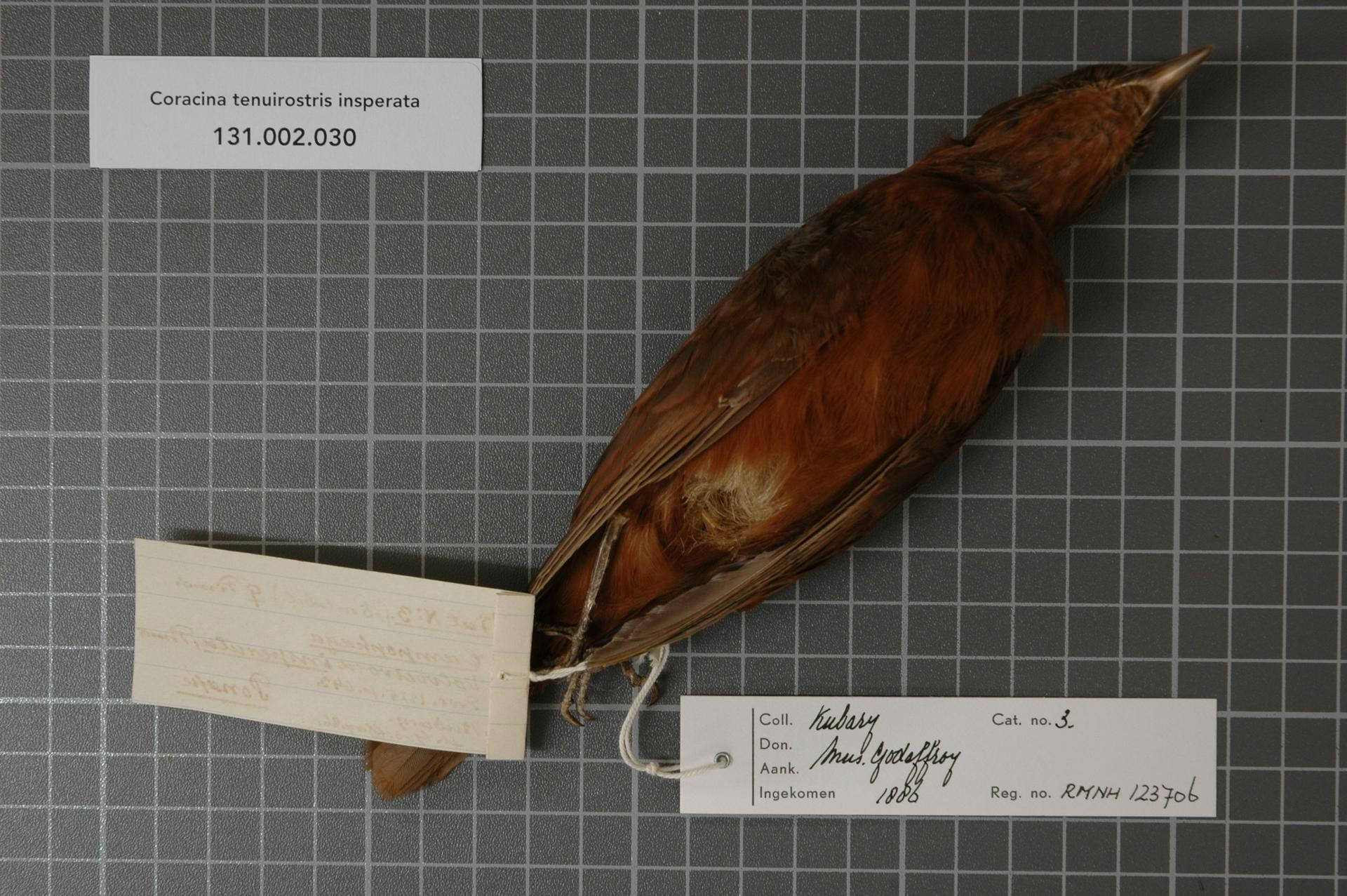

Conservation status
- Endangered (IUCN 3.1)

Scientific classification
- Kingdom: Animalia
- Phylum: Chordata
- Class: Aves
- Order: Passeriformes
- Family: Campephagidae
- Genus: Edolisoma
- Species: E. insperatum

Binomial name
- Edolisoma insperatum (Finsch, 1876)

Synonyms
- Coracina insperata; Coracina tenuirostris insperata

= Pohnpei cicadabird =

Species of bird

The Pohnpei cicadabird (Edolisoma insperatum) is a species of bird in the genus Edolisoma, and the wider family, Campephagidae. It is endemic to the Caroline Islands. It was previously considered conspecific with the common cicadabird.

Its natural habitat is subtropical or tropical moist lowland forest.

== Description ==
The Pohnpei cicadabird is a sexually dimorphic, small cuckooshrike. Males mostly gray, with black on their head, wings, and tail. Females have a gray cap and a rufous-brown body.
