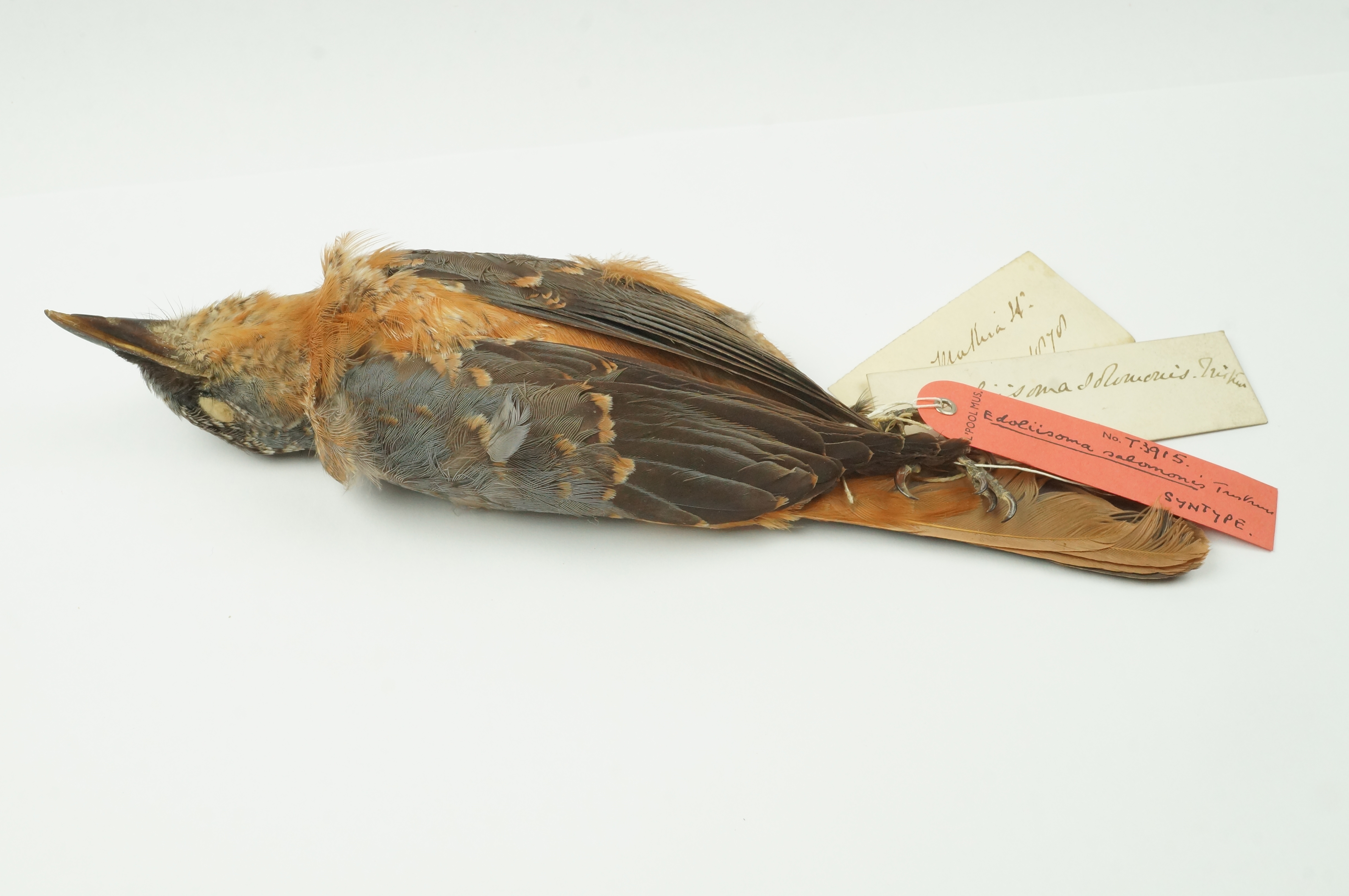
- Museum specimen of Edolisoma salomonis

Conservation status
- Least Concern (IUCN 3.1)

Scientific classification
- Kingdom: Animalia
- Phylum: Chordata
- Class: Aves
- Order: Passeriformes
- Family: Campephagidae
- Genus: Edolisoma
- Species: E. salomonis

Binomial name
- Edolisoma salomonis Tristram, 1879

Synonyms
- Coracina salomonis

= Makira cicadabird =

Species of bird

The Makira cicadabird (Edolisoma salomonis) is a species of bird in the family Campephagidae. It is endemic to the Solomon Islands. It used to be considered a subspecies of the common cicadabird.

Its natural habitats are subtropical or tropical moist lowland forest and subtropical or tropical moist montane forest.
