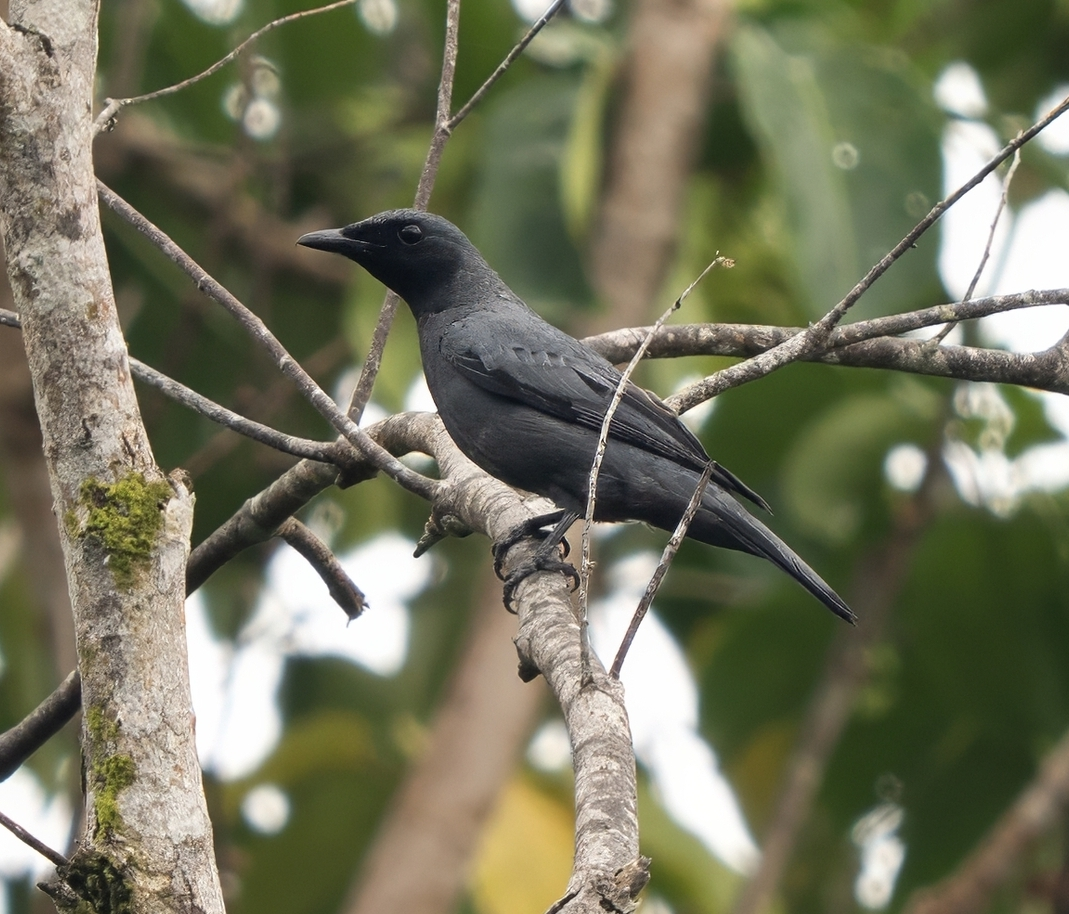
- Male
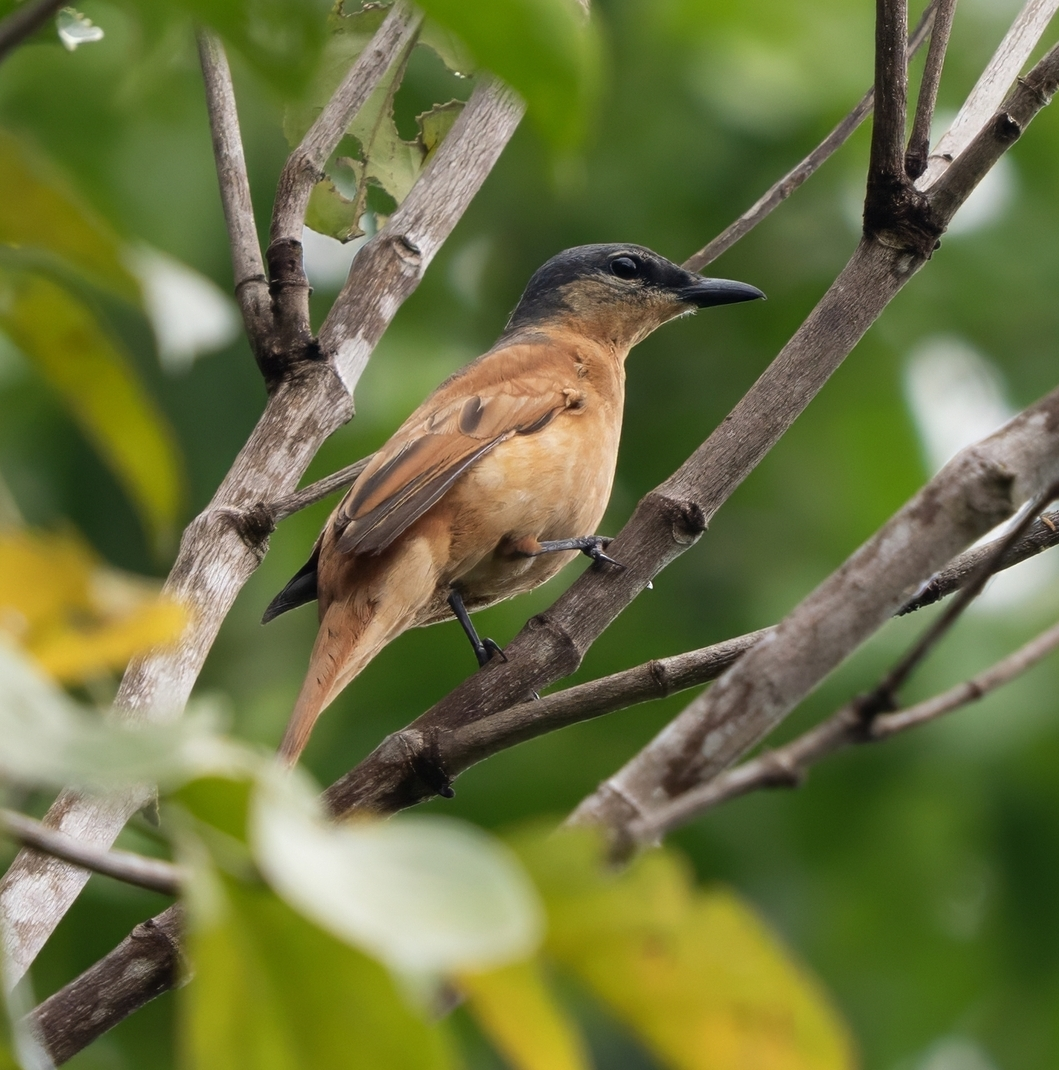
- Female

Conservation status
- Not evaluated (IUCN 3.1)

Scientific classification
- Kingdom: Animalia
- Phylum: Chordata
- Class: Aves
- Order: Passeriformes
- Family: Campephagidae
- Genus: Edolisoma
- Species: E. pelingi

Binomial name
- Edolisoma pelingi Hartert, EJO, 1918

= Banggai cicadabird =

Species of bird

The Banggai cicadabird (Edolisoma pelingi) is a passerine bird in the family Campephagidae that is found on the Banggai Islands off the east coast of Sulawesi, Indonesia. It was formerly considered to be conspecific with the common cicadabird, now renamed the Sahul cicadabird.

== Taxonomy ==
The Banggai cicadabird was formally described in 1918 by the German ornithologist Ernst Hartert based on specimens collected on the island of "Peling" now Peleng. This is the largest of the Banggai Islands which are just to the east of Sulawesi, Indonesia. Hartert considered his specimen to represent a subspecies on the Obi cicadabird and coined the trinomial name Edolisoma obiense pelingi. The Banggai cicdabird was formerly treated as conspecific with the common cicadabird (now renamed the Sahul cicadabird) (Edolisoma tenuirostre). It has been elevated to species status based on the differences in morphology and a molecular phylogenetic study published in 2018. The genetic study found the Banggai cicadabird and the Obi cicadabird are sister species. No subspecies are recognised.
