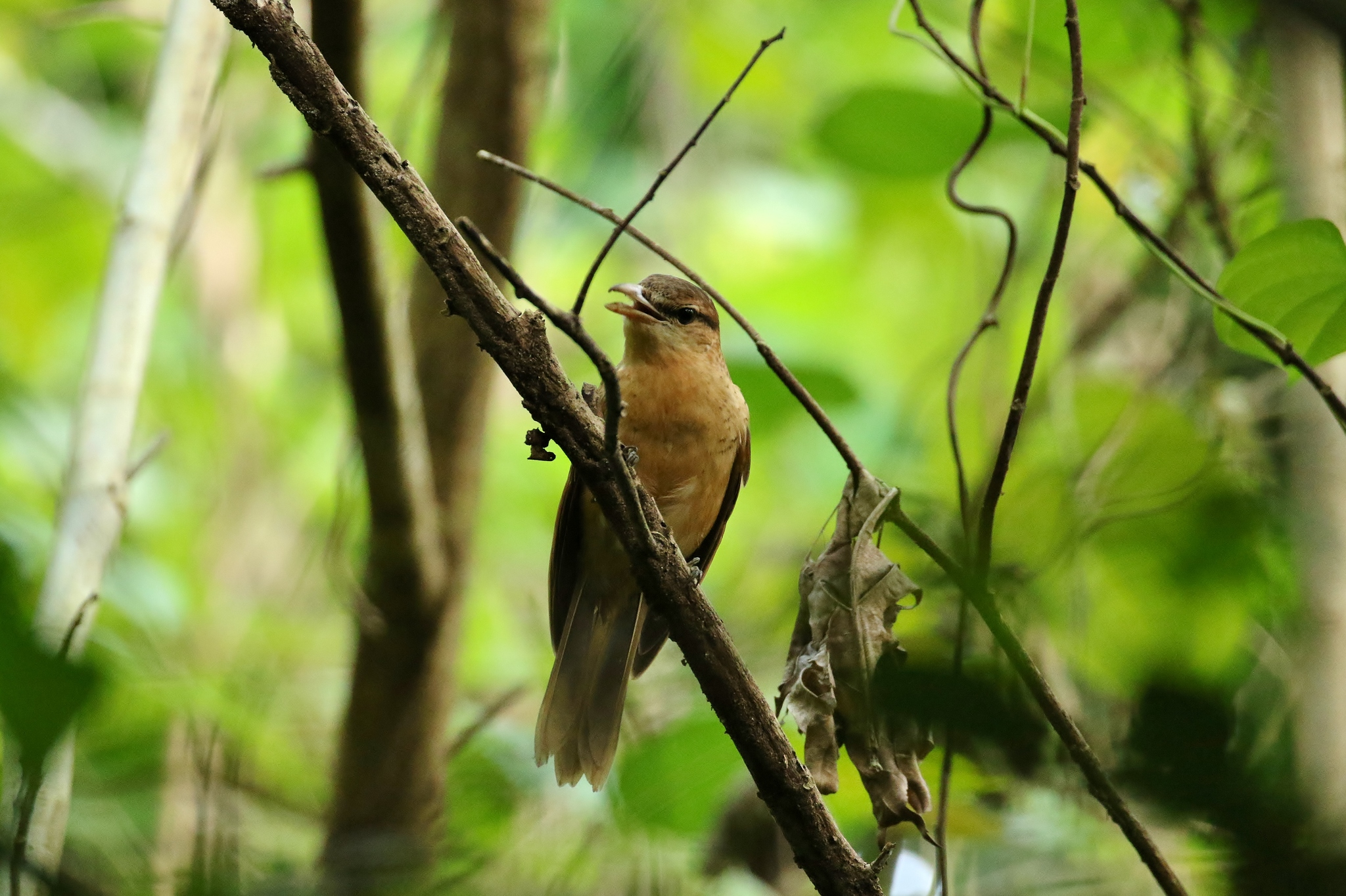

Conservation status
- Endangered (IUCN 3.1)

Scientific classification
- Kingdom: Animalia
- Phylum: Chordata
- Class: Aves
- Order: Passeriformes
- Family: Campephagidae
- Genus: Edolisoma
- Species: E. nesiotis

Binomial name
- Edolisoma nesiotis (Hartlaub & Finsch, 1872)

Synonyms
- Coracina nesiotis; Campephaga nesiotis; Coracina tenuirostris nesiotis

= Yap cicadabird =

Species of bird

The Yap cicadabird (Edolisoma nesiotis), sometimes considered to be a distinctive subspecies of the common cicadabird, is a species of bird in the cuckooshrike family, Campephagidae.

It is endemic to Yap, a small island cluster in the western Caroline Islands, and part of the Federated States of Micronesia in the western Pacific Ocean. The indigenous name in the Yapese language can be spelled either as "Oschang" or "Qœschæng".

It inhabits the dry tropical forest there. The species displays sexual dimorphism, with the females a brownish color and the males a darker shade of blue or purple.
