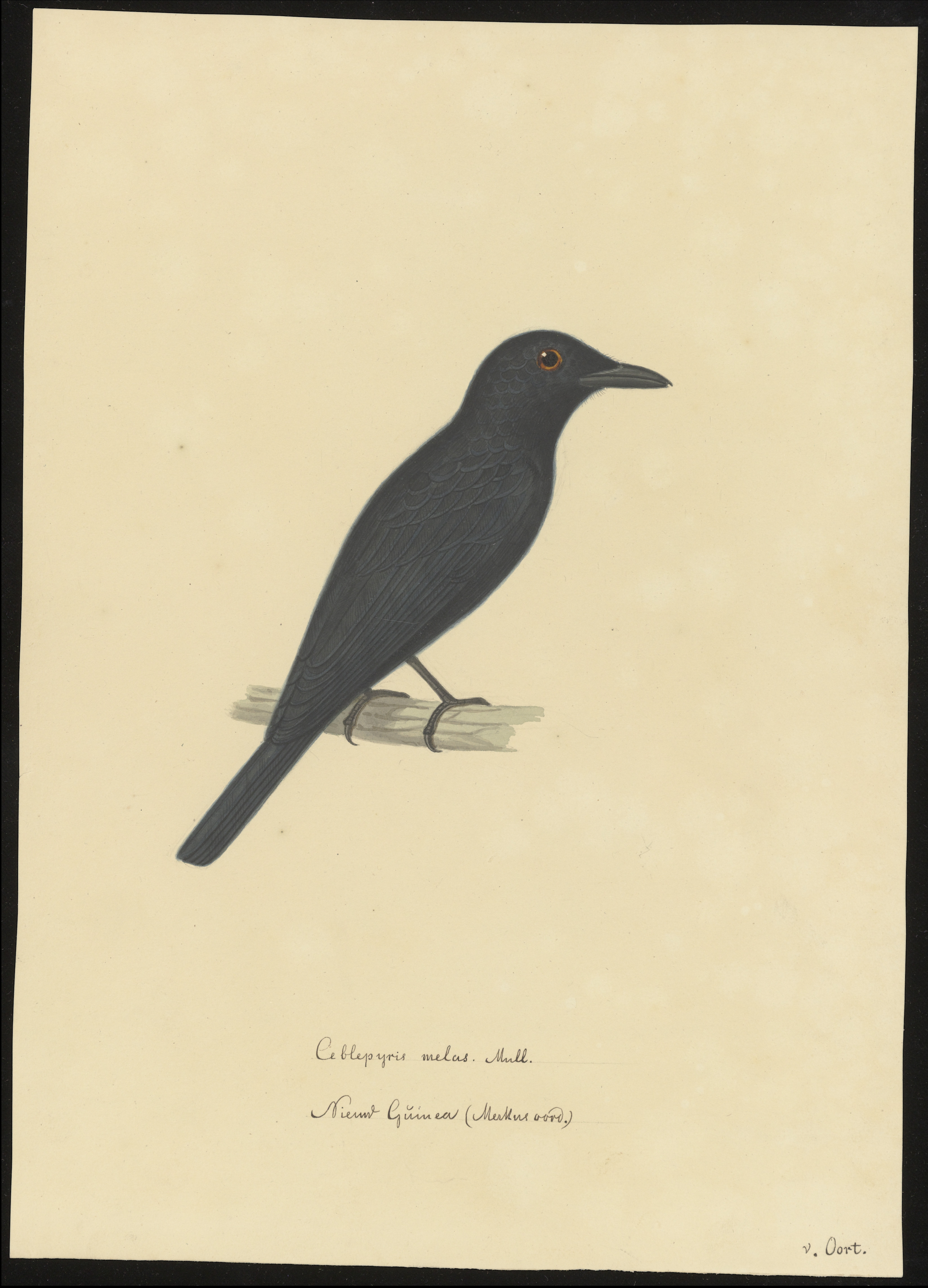

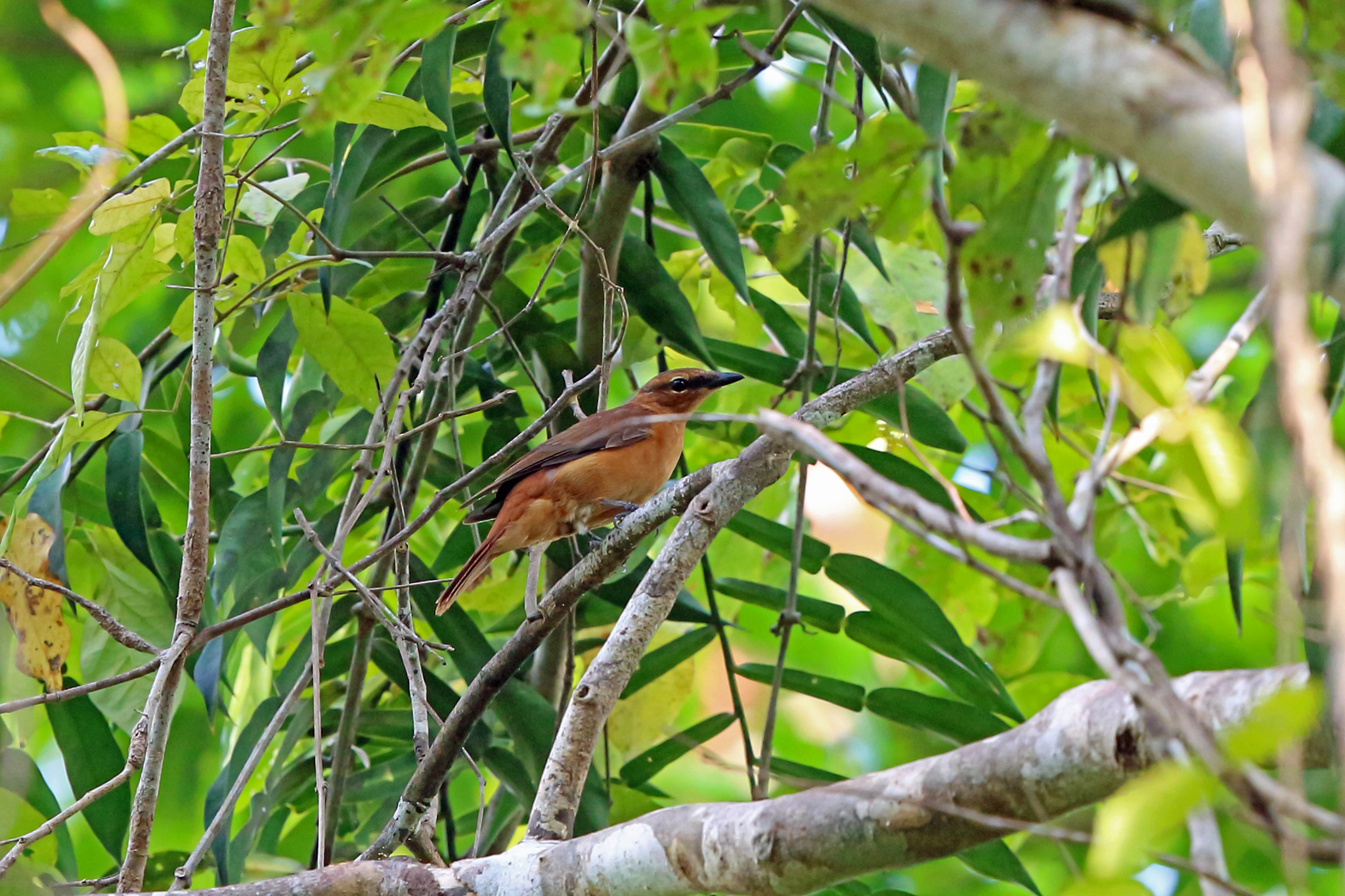

Conservation status
- Least Concern (IUCN 3.1)

Scientific classification
- Kingdom: Animalia
- Phylum: Chordata
- Class: Aves
- Order: Passeriformes
- Family: Campephagidae
- Genus: Edolisoma
- Species: E. melas

Binomial name
- Edolisoma melas (Lesson, 1828)

Synonyms
- Coracina melas

= Black cicadabird =

Species of bird

The black cicadabird (Edolisoma melas), also known as the New Guinea cuckooshrike or New Guinea cicadabird, is a species of bird in the family Campephagidae. It is found in the Aru Islands and New Guinea. Its natural habitats are subtropical or tropical moist lowland forest and subtropical or tropical mangrove forest.
