= Bamus Volcano =

Coordinates: 5°12′S 151°14′E

Bamus Volcano is a volcano on New Britain near Ulawun. It last erupted in 1886.

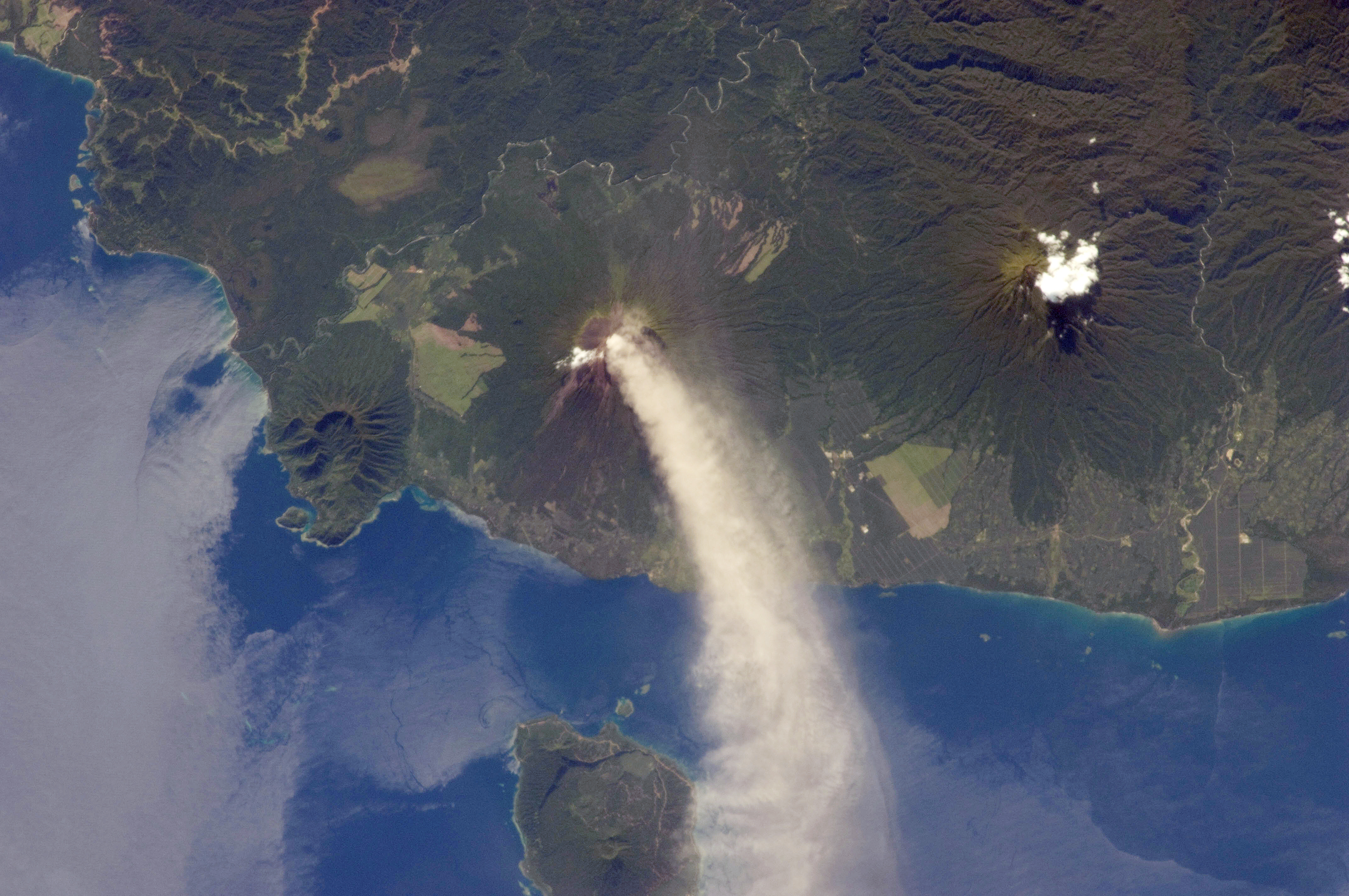
Bamus, Ulawun, Likuruanga and Lolobau

It is classified as a stratovolcano and noted to have a breached crater. Its elevation is 2,248 m (7,375 ft).
