= Likuruanga =

Volcano on New Britain, Papua New Guinea

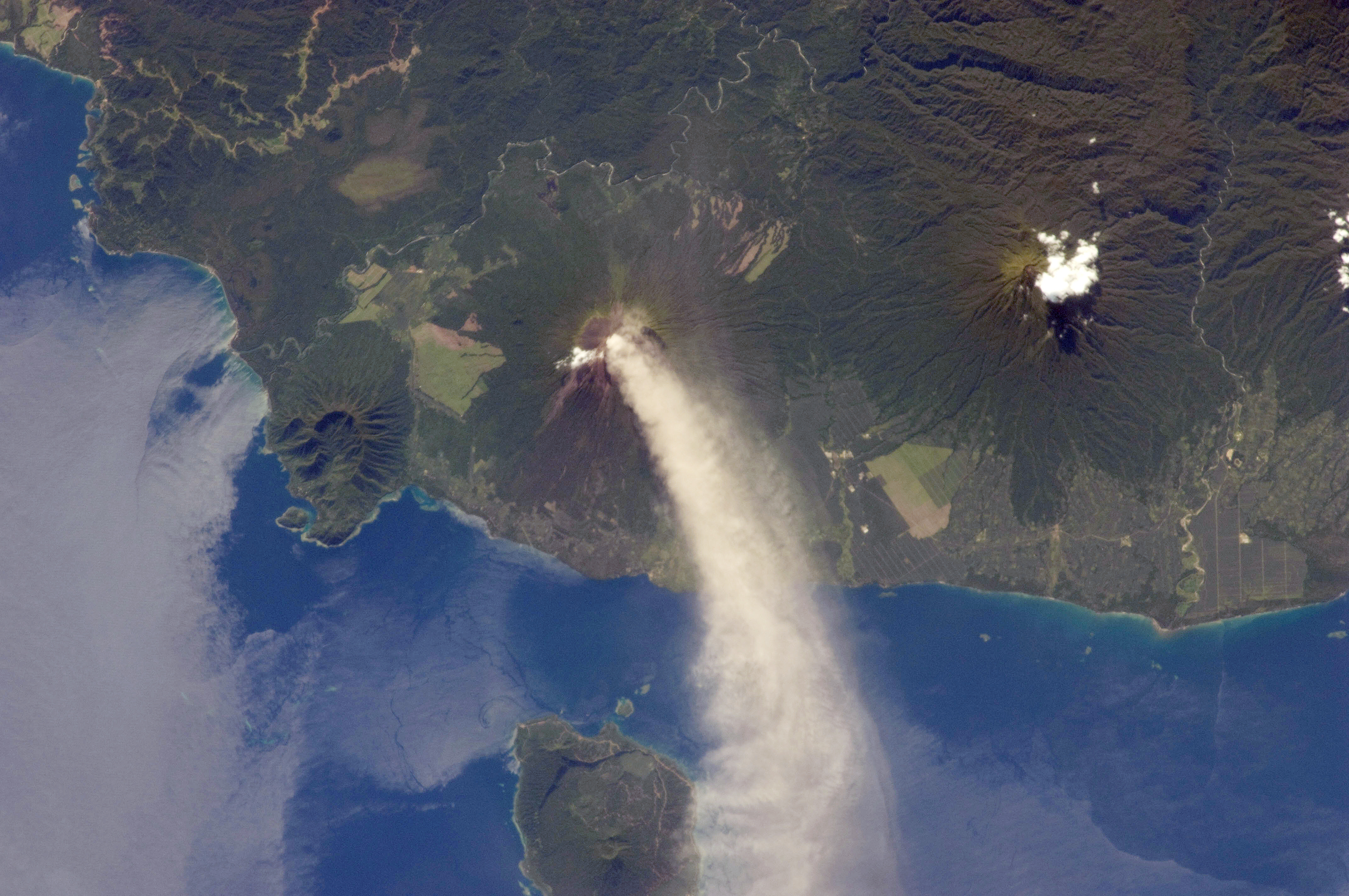
- Left to right: Likuruanga, Ulawun and Bamus. Lolobau Island is at the bottom of image.

Highest point
- Elevation: 904 m (2,966 ft)
- Coordinates: 4.953°S 151.385°E

Geography
- Location within Papua New Guinea
- Location: West New Britain, Papua New Guinea

Geology
- Mountain type: Stratovolcano
- Last eruption: Pleistocene

Likuruanga is a stratovolcano in easternmost West New Britain Province on the island of New Britain, Papua New Guinea. Its low, dissected edifice contains a large volcanic crater that is breached to the north. The last known eruption from Likuruanga is prehistoric in age, having taken place during the Pleistocene epoch.

A fatality occurred on Likuruanga's northern flank in September 2006 when a boy died in a hole at the village of Bakada. The cause of death was carbon dioxide asphyxiation.

== See also ==
- List of volcanoes in Papua New Guinea
