= South Moluccan cicadabird =

Conservation status
- Not evaluated (IUCN 3.1)

Scientific classification
- Kingdom: Animalia
- Phylum: Chordata
- Class: Aves
- Order: Passeriformes
- Family: Campephagidae
- Genus: Edolisoma
- Species: E. amboinense

Binomial name
- Edolisoma amboinense (Hartlaub, 1865)

Species of bird

The South Moluccan cicadabird (Edolisoma amboinense) is a passerine bird in the family Campephagidae found on the islands of Buru, Ambon, and Seram in the Maluku Islands of Indonesia. The species was formerly considered conspecific with the common cicadabird, now renamed the Sahul cicadabird.

== Taxonomy ==
The South Moluccan cicadabird was formally described in 1865 by German ornithologist Gustav Hartlaub based on a specimen collected on Ambon Island (Ambon) in the Maluku Islands. He coined the binomial name Ceblepyris amboinense. The South Moluccan cicadabird was formerly treated as conspecific with the common cicadabird (now renamed the Sahul cicadabird) (Edolisoma tenuirostre) but has since been elevated to species status. The species is monotypic: no subspecies are recognised.
