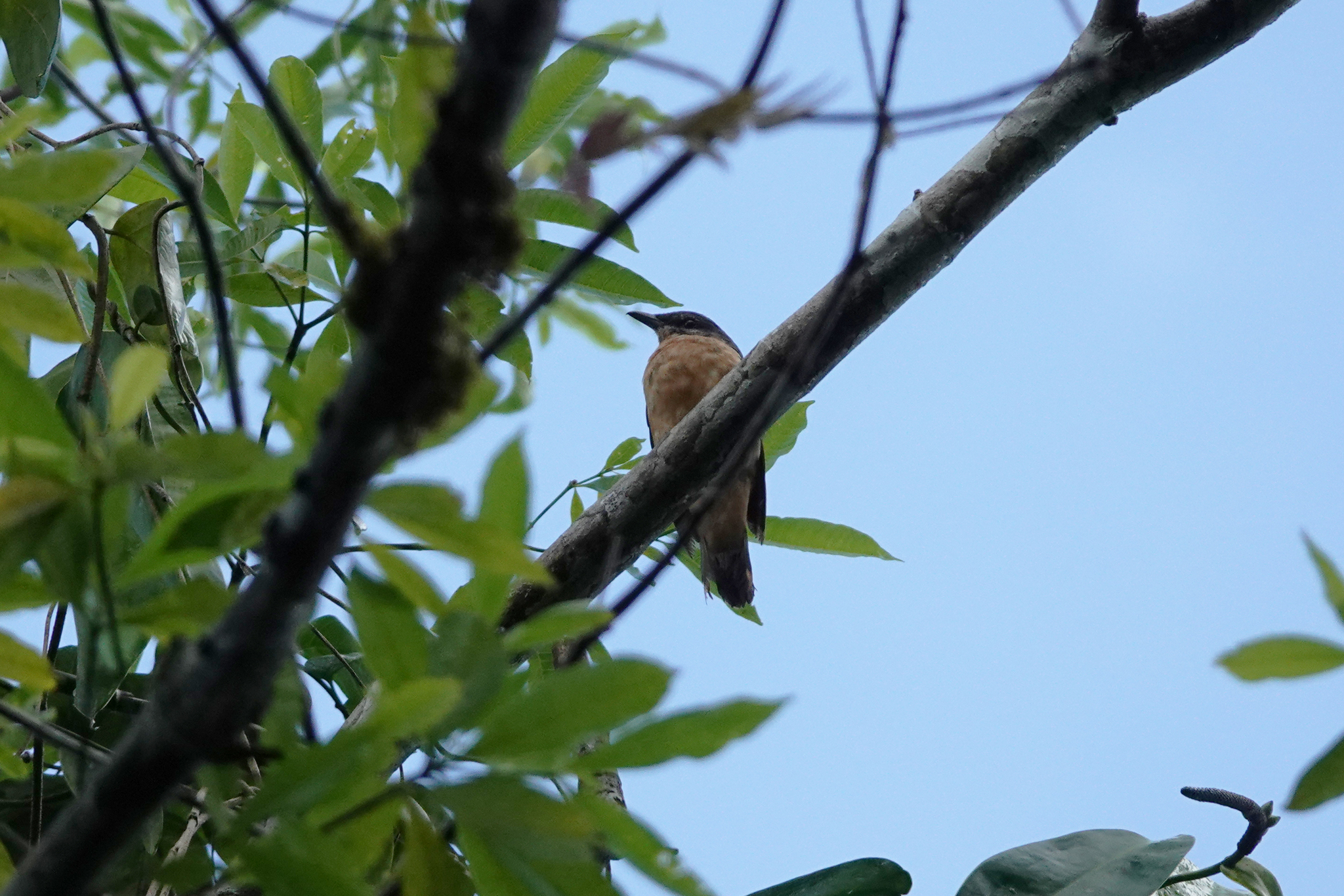

Conservation status
- Not evaluated (IUCN 3.1)

Scientific classification
- Kingdom: Animalia
- Phylum: Chordata
- Class: Aves
- Order: Passeriformes
- Family: Campephagidae
- Genus: Edolisoma
- Species: E. meyerii

Binomial name
- Edolisoma meyerii Salvadori, 1878

= Geelvink cicadabird =

Species of bird

The Geelvink cicadabird (Edolisoma meyerii) is a passerine bird in the family Campephagidae that is found on the islands of Numfor and Biak in the Geelvink Bay of New Guinea. It was formerly considered to be conspecific with the common cicadabird, now renamed the Sahul cicadabird.

== Taxonomy ==
The Geelvink cicadbird was formally described in 1878 by the Italian zoologist Tommaso Salvadori based on a specimen collected on the island of Biak in the Geelvink Bay of New Guinea. He coined the binomial name Edolisoma meyerii where the specific epithet was chosen to honour the German physician Adolf Bernhard Meyer. The Geelvink cicadbird was formerly treated as conspecific with the common cicadabird (now renamed the Sahul cicadabird) (Edolisoma tenuirostre) but has been elevated to species status based on plumage differences and a molecular phylogenetic study published in 2018.

Two subspecies are recognised:

- E. m. numforanum (Peters, JL & Mayr, 1960) – Numfor (Geelvink Bay Islands, northwest New Guinea)
- E. m. meyerii Salvadori, 1878 – Biak (Geelvink Bay Islands, northwest New Guinea)
