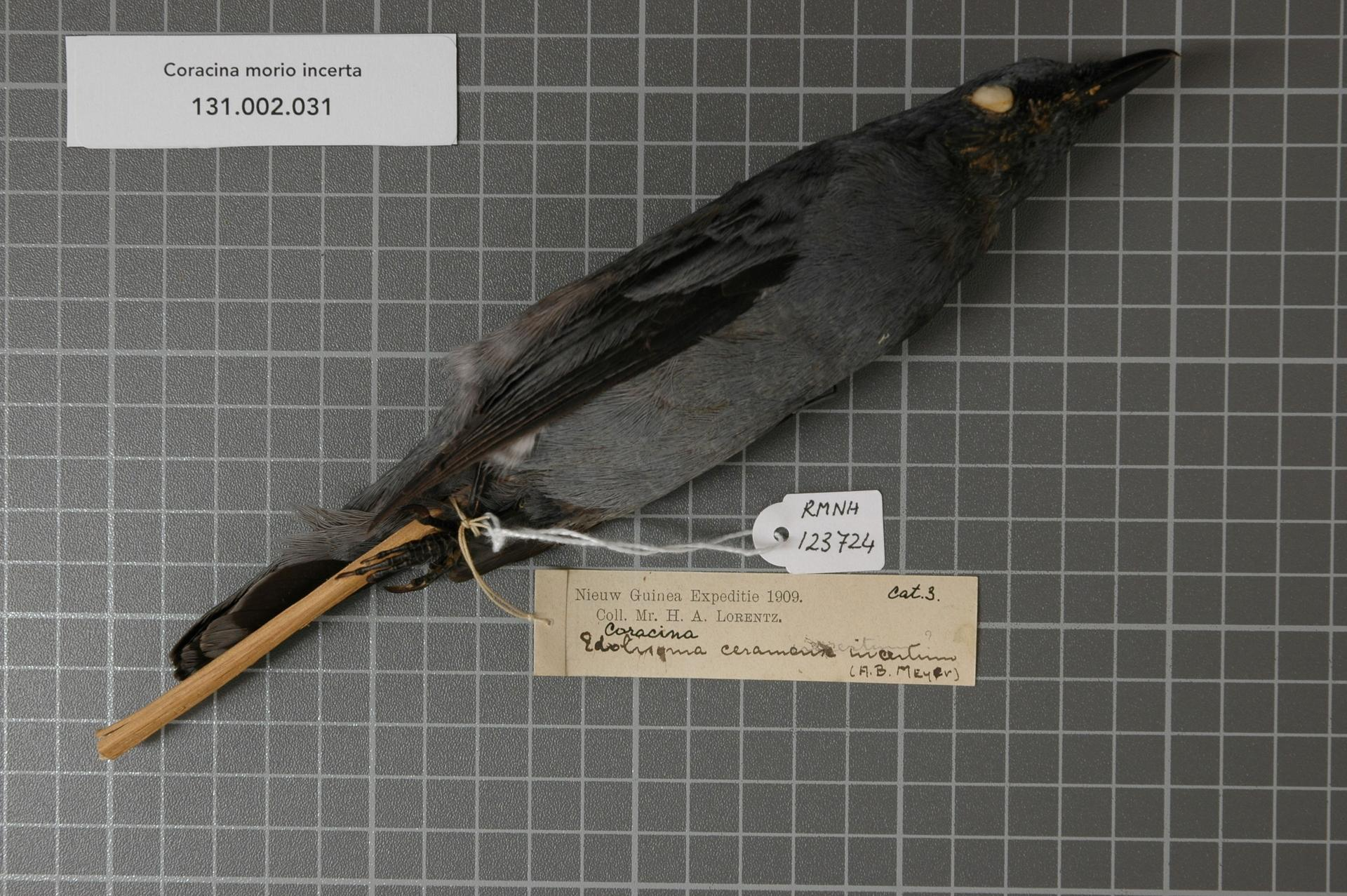

Conservation status
- Least Concern (IUCN 3.1)

Scientific classification
- Kingdom: Animalia
- Phylum: Chordata
- Class: Aves
- Order: Passeriformes
- Family: Campephagidae
- Genus: Edolisoma
- Species: E. incertum

Binomial name
- Edolisoma incertum (Meyer, 1874)

Synonyms
- Coracina incerta

= Black-shouldered cicadabird =

Species of bird

The black-shouldered cicadabird or Papuan cicadabird (Edolisoma incertum) is a species of bird in the family Campephagidae. It is found in New Guinea. Its natural habitats are subtropical or tropical moist lowland forest and subtropical or tropical moist montane forest.
