= Kai cicadabird =

Conservation status
- Least Concern (IUCN 3.1)]

Scientific classification
- Kingdom: Animalia
- Phylum: Chordata
- Class: Aves
- Order: Passeriformes
- Family: Campephagidae
- Genus: Edolisoma
- Species: E. dispar

Binomial name
- Edolisoma dispar Salvadori, 1878

Synonyms
- Coracina dispar

Species of bird

The Kai cicadabird (Edolisoma dispar) is a species of bird in the family Campephagidae. It is endemic to Indonesia.

Its natural habitat is subtropical or tropical moist lowland forest. It is threatened by habitat loss.
