= Rossel cicadabird =

Conservation status
- Near Threatened (IUCN 3.1)

Scientific classification
- Domain: Eukaryota
- Kingdom: Animalia
- Phylum: Chordata
- Class: Aves
- Order: Passeriformes
- Family: Campephagidae
- Genus: Edolisoma
- Species: E. rostratum

Binomial name
- Edolisoma rostratum Hartert, 1898

Species of bird

The Rossel cicadabird (Edolisoma rostratum) is a species of bird in the family Campephagidae that is endemic to Rossel Island in Papua New Guinea. It was recently reclassified from a subspecies of the slender-billed cicadabird to its own individual species.
