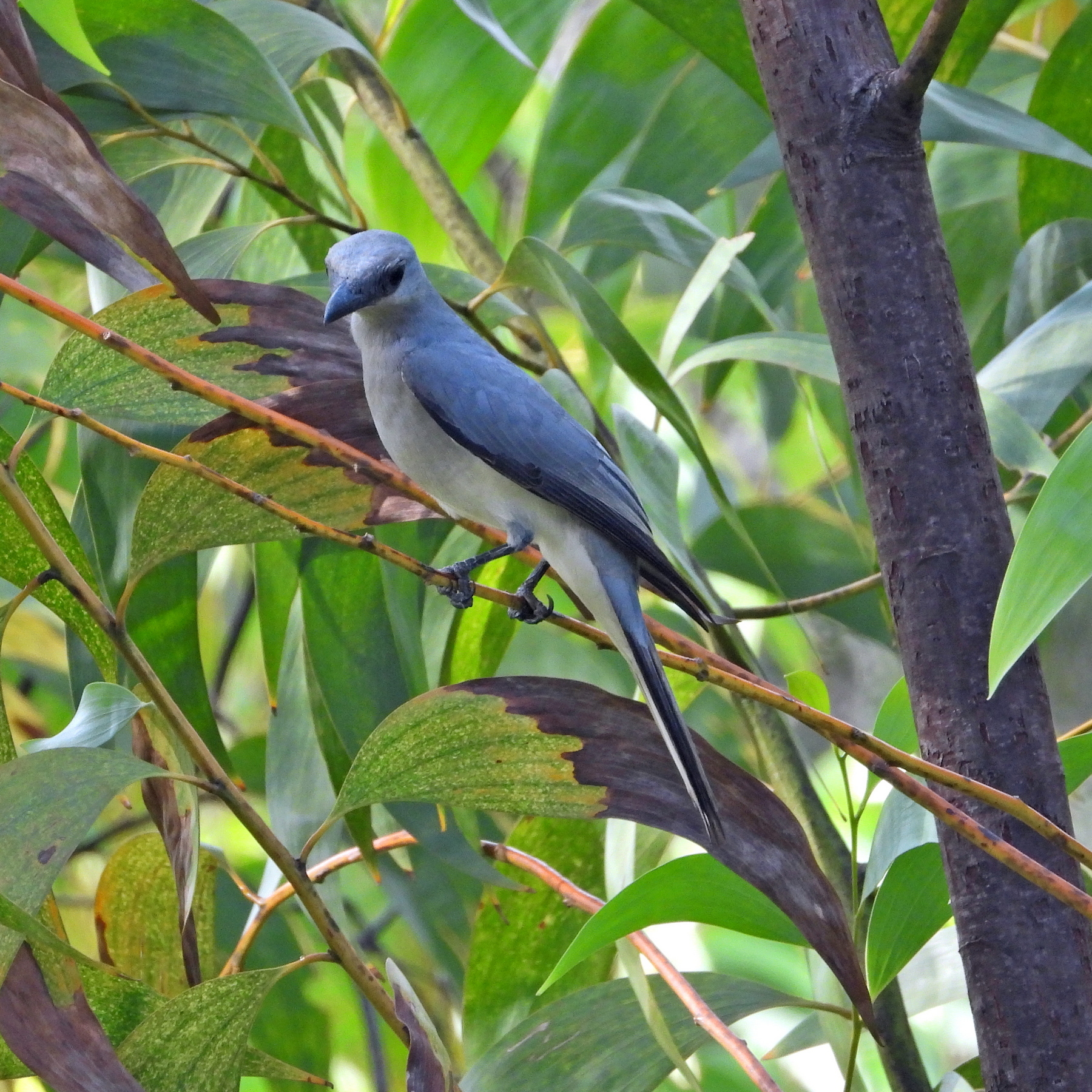

Conservation status
- Least Concern (IUCN 3.1)

Scientific classification
- Kingdom: Animalia
- Phylum: Chordata
- Class: Aves
- Order: Passeriformes
- Family: Campephagidae
- Genus: Edolisoma
- Species: E. ceramense

Binomial name
- Edolisoma ceramense (Bonaparte, 1850)

Synonyms
- Coracina ceramensis

= Pale cicadabird =

Species of bird

The pale cicadabird (Edolisoma ceramense) is a species of bird in the family Campephagidae. It is endemic to the Maluku Islands of Indonesia. Its natural habitats are subtropical or tropical moist lowland forest and subtropical or tropical moist montane forest.
