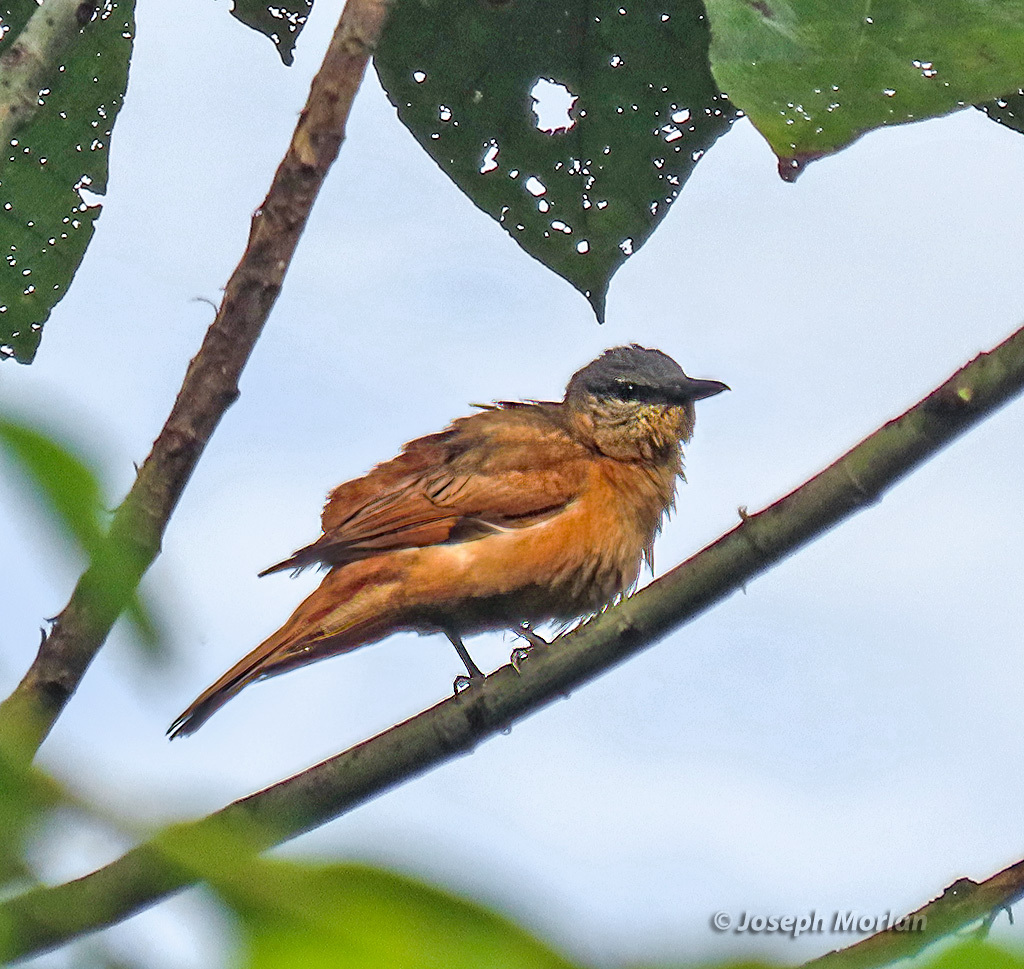
- Female
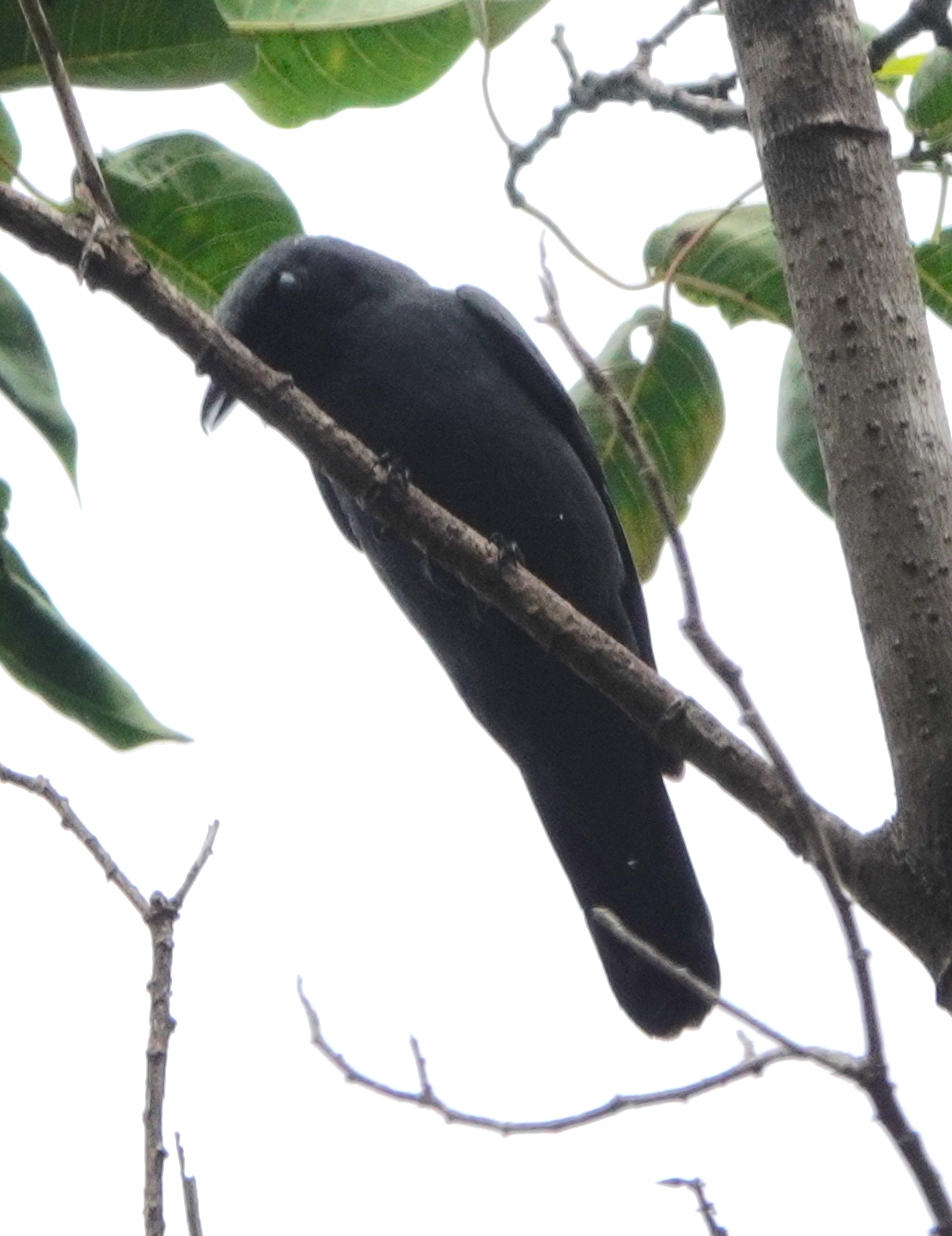
- Male

Conservation status
- Least Concern (IUCN 3.1)

Scientific classification
- Kingdom: Animalia
- Phylum: Chordata
- Class: Aves
- Order: Passeriformes
- Family: Campephagidae
- Genus: Edolisoma
- Species: E. obiense

Binomial name
- Edolisoma obiense Salvadori, 1878

= Obi cicadabird =

Species of bird

The Obi cicadabird (Edolisoma obiense) is a passerine bird in the family Campephagidae that is found the island of Obi in the Maluku Islands (or Moluccas) in Indonesia. The species was formerly considered to be conspecific with the common cicadabird, now renamed the Sahul cicadabird.

== Taxonomy ==
The Obi cicadabird was formally described in 1878 by the Italian zoologist Tommaso Salvadori based on specimens collected on the island of Obi in the Maluku Islands. Salvadori coined the binomial name Edolisoma obiense. The Obi cicadabird was formerly treated as conspecific with the common cicadabird (now renamed the Sahul cicadabird) (Edolisoma tenuirostre). It has been elevated to species status based on the differences in morphology and a molecular phylogenetic study published in 2018. The genetic study found that the Obi cicadabird was sister to the Banggai cicadabird. The species is monotypic: no subspecies are recognised.
