= Timor cicadabird =

Conservation status
- Not evaluated (IUCN 3.1)

Scientific classification
- Domain: Eukaryota
- Kingdom: Animalia
- Phylum: Chordata
- Class: Aves
- Order: Passeriformes
- Family: Campephagidae
- Genus: Edolisoma
- Species: E. timoriense

Binomial name
- Edolisoma timoriense Sharpe, 1878

Species of bird

The Timor cicadabird (Edolisoma timoriense) is a passerine bird in the family Campephagidae that is found on the islands of Lembata, Alor and Timor in Indonesia. The species was formerly considered to be conspecific with the common cicadabird, now renamed the Sahul cicadabird.

== Taxonomy ==
The Timor cicadabird was formally described in 1878 by English ornithologist Richard Bowdler Sharpe based on a specimen collected by Adolf Bernhard Meyer on the island of Timor, Indonesia. Sharpe coined the binomial name Edoliisoma timoriense. The Timor cicadabird was formerly treated as conspecific with the common cicadabird (now renamed the Sahul cicadabird) (Edolisoma tenuirostre). It has been elevated to species status based on the differences in morphology and a molecular phylogenetic study published in 2018.

Three subspecies are recognised:

- E. t. kalaotuae Meise, 1929 – Kalaotoa (southeast of south Sulawesi)
- E. t. emancipatum Hartert, EJO, 1896 – Tanah Jampea (south of southwest Sulawesi)
- E. t. timoriense Sharpe, 1878 – Lembata, Alor Island and Timor (central, east Lesser Sunda Islands)
