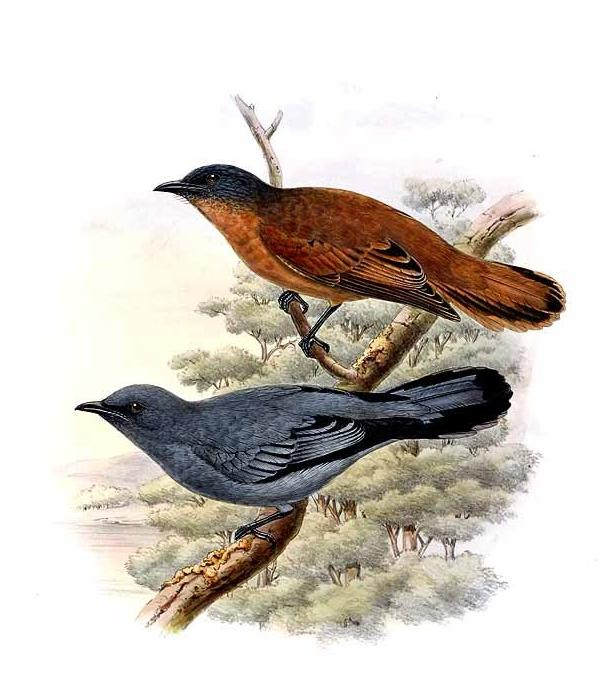
- Drawing by John Gould
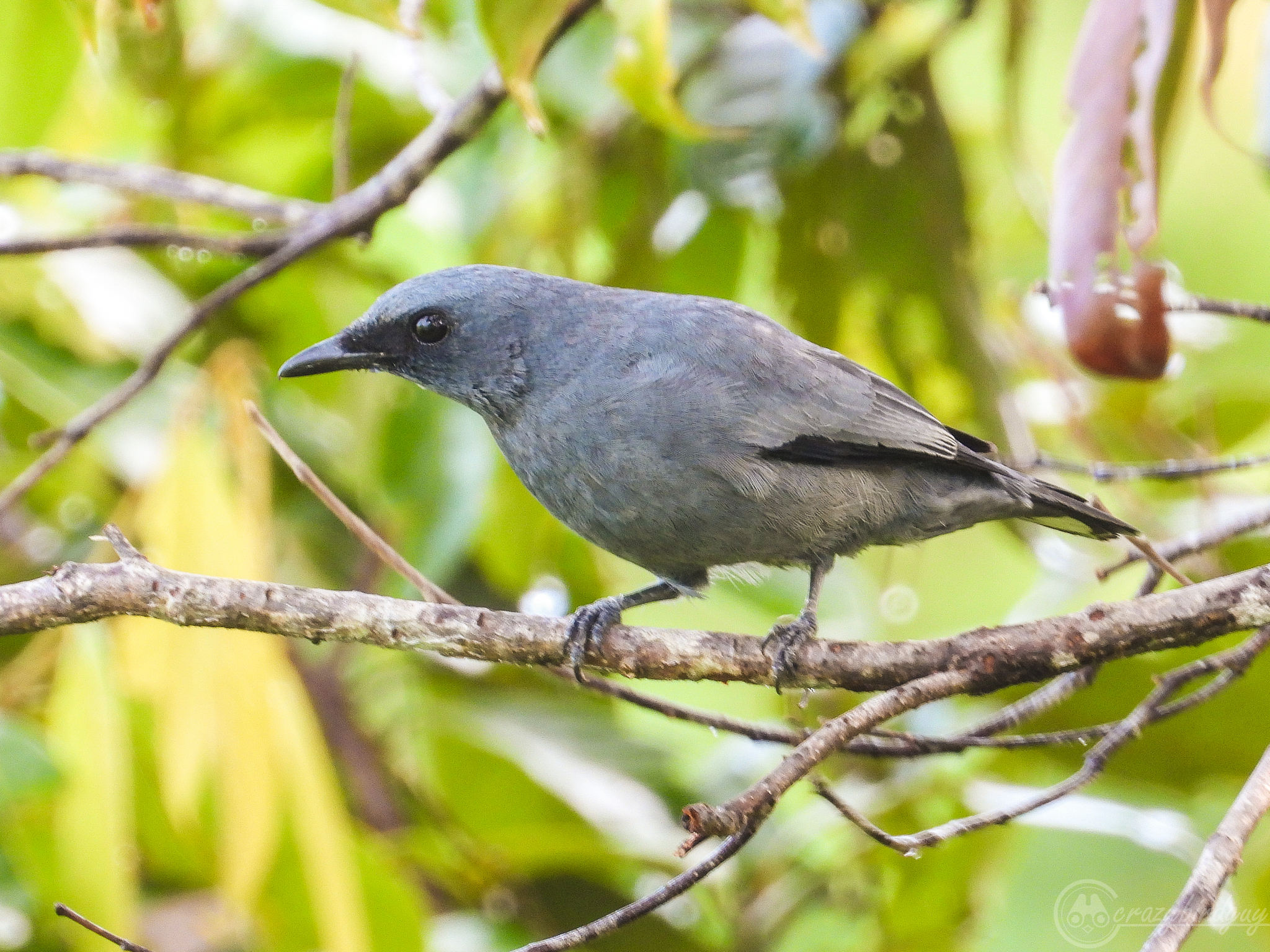

Conservation status
- Least Concern (IUCN 3.1)

Scientific classification
- Kingdom: Animalia
- Phylum: Chordata
- Class: Aves
- Order: Passeriformes
- Family: Campephagidae
- Genus: Edolisoma
- Species: E. schisticeps

Binomial name
- Edolisoma schisticeps (Gray, 1846)

Synonyms
- Coracina schisticeps

= Grey-headed cuckooshrike =

Species of bird

The grey-headed cuckooshrike (Edolisoma schisticeps), also known as the grey-headed cicadabird or black-tipped cicadabird, is a species of bird in the family Campephagidae. It is found in New Guinea. Its natural habitats are subtropical or tropical moist lowland forest and subtropical or tropical mangrove forest.

== Subspecies ==
- E. s. schisticeps
- E. s. poliopsa
- E. s. reichenowi can be distinguished by the female's red crown
