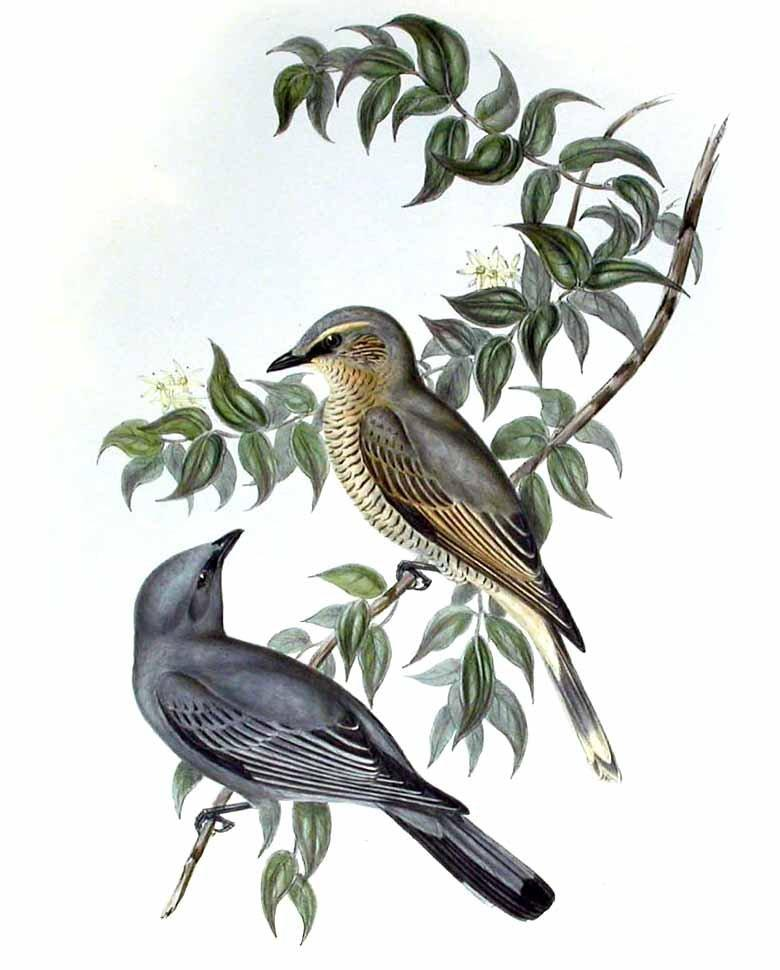
- Common cicadabird (Edolisoma tenuirostre)

Scientific classification
- Kingdom: Animalia
- Phylum: Chordata
- Class: Aves
- Order: Passeriformes
- Family: Campephagidae
- Genus: Edolisoma; Pucheran, 1853

Type species
- Campephaga marescotii Gray, 1846

Species
- See text

= Edolisoma =

Genus of birds

Edolisoma is a genus of birds in the cuckooshrike family Campephagidae that are native to the Central Indo-Pacific region, Australia and New Guinea.

== Taxonomy ==
These species were previously placed in the genus Coracina. They were moved to the resurrected genus Edolisoma based on the results of a molecular phylogenetic study published in 2010.

The genus Edolisoma was introduced in 1853 by the French zoologist Jacques Pucheran with the type species as Campephaga marescotii Gray, 1846. This is now considered to be a junior synonym of Lanius melas Lesson, 1828, the black cicadabird. The name of the genus is derived from the genus Edolius that had been introduced by the French naturalist Georges Cuvier in 1816.

== Species ==
The genus contains the following 31 species:

- New Caledonian cuckooshrike, Edolisoma anale
- White-winged cuckooshrike, Edolisoma ostentum
- Blackish cuckooshrike, Edolisoma coerulescens
- Black-bellied cuckooshrike, Edolisoma montanum
- Pale-shouldered cicadabird, Edolisoma dohertyi
- Kai cicadabird, Edolisoma dispar
- Grey-headed cuckooshrike, Edolisoma schisticeps
- Pale cicadabird, Edolisoma ceramense
- Black-bibbed cicadabird, Edolisoma mindanense
- Makira cicadabird, Edolisoma salomonis
- Solomons cicadabird, Edolisoma holopolium
- Malaita cicadabird, Edolisoma tricolor (split from E. holopolium)
- Sulawesi cicadabird, Edolisoma morio
- Sangihe cicadabird, Edolisoma salvadorii (split from E. morio)
- Black-shouldered cicadabird, Edolisoma incertum
- Bismarck cicadabird, Edolisoma remotum (formerly grey-capped cicadabird)
- Central Melanesian cicadabird, Edolisoma erythropygium
- Sula cicadabird, Edolisoma sula
- Sahul cicadabird, Edolisoma tenuirostre (formerly common cicadabird before splits)
- Rossel cicadabird, Edolisoma rostratum
- Geelvink cicadabird, Edolisoma meyerii (split from E. tenuirostre)
- Banggai cicadabird, Edolisoma pelingi (split from E. tenuirostre)
- Obi cicadabird, Edolisoma obiense (split from E. tenuirostre)
- North Moluccan cicadabird, Edolisoma grayi (split from E. tenuirostre)
- South Moluccan cicadabird, Edolisoma amboinense (split from E. tenuirostre)
- Timor cicadabird, Edolisoma timoriense (split from E. tenuirostre)
- Admiralty cicadabird, Edolisoma admiralitatis
- Palau cicadabird, Edolisoma monacha
- Yap cicadabird, Edolisoma nesiotis
- Pohnpei cicadabird, Edolisoma insperatum
- Black cicadabird, Edolisoma melas
