= Lolobau Island =

Island of Papua New Guinea

Coordinates: 4.9167°S 151.1667°E

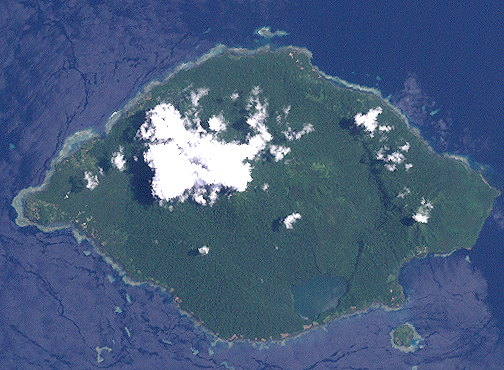
Lolobau Island

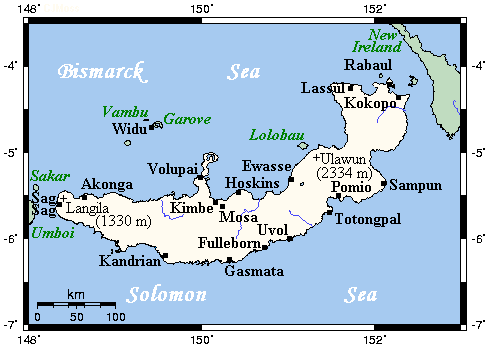
Lolobau Island is to the north of New Britain island

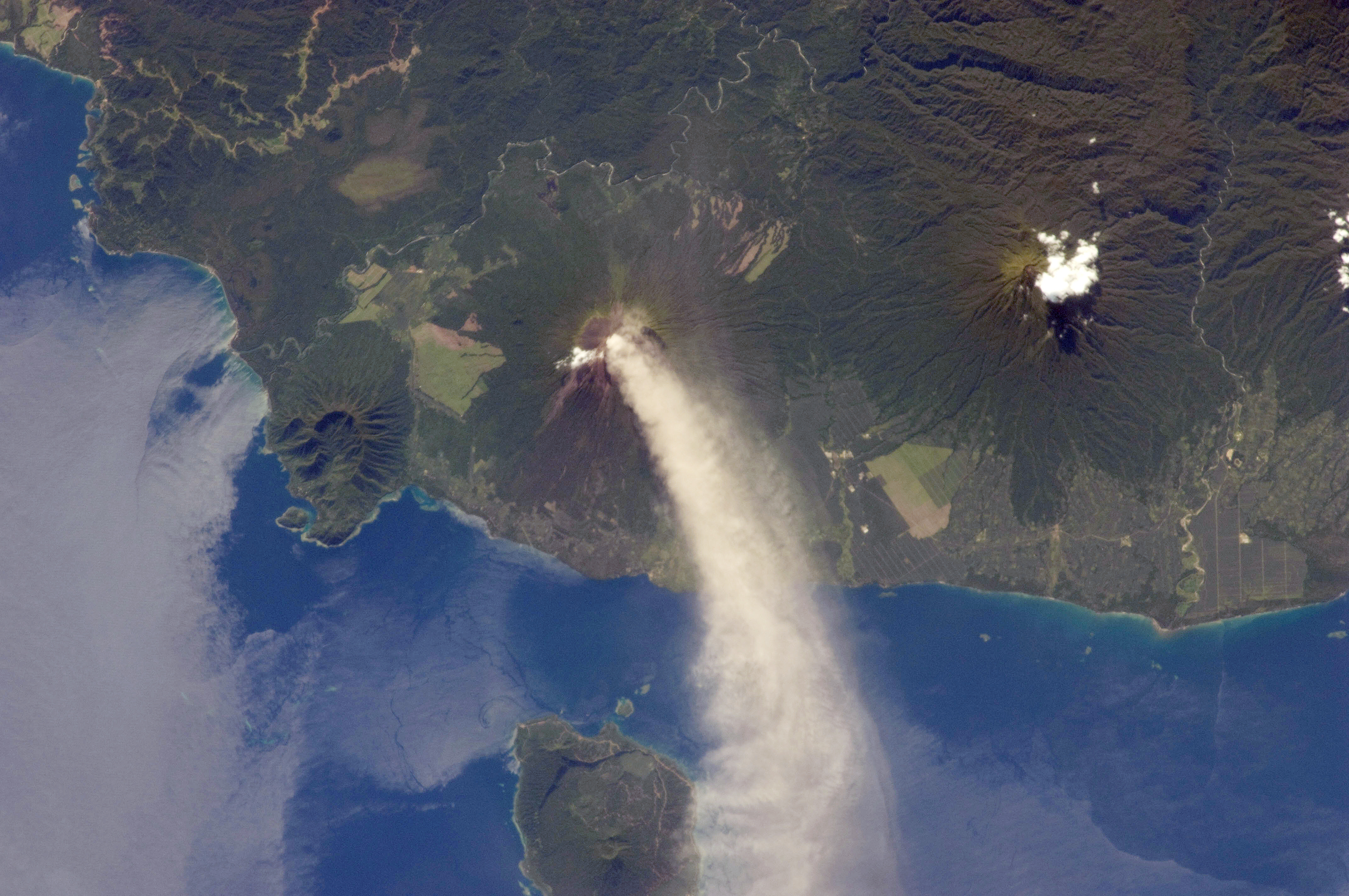
Lolobau Island (bottom) and Likuruanga, Ulawun and Bamus volcanoes on New Britain island.

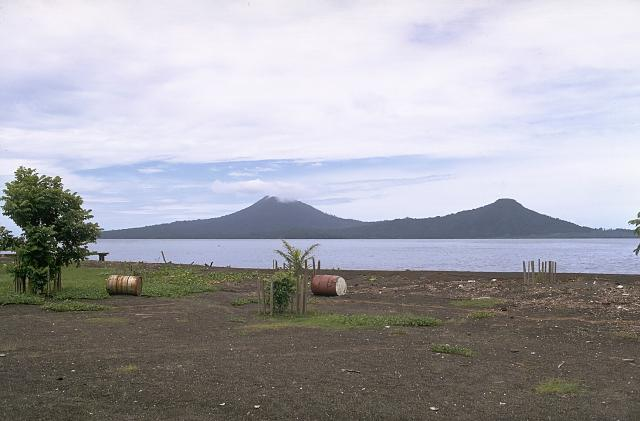
Lolobau Island as seen from the mainland, 1970

Lolobau Island is an island in the Bismarck Sea, within the West New Britain Province of the Islands Region, in northern Papua New Guinea.

During World War II a number military actions occurred near Lolobau Island including in early 1943. For example, on May 3, 1943 B-24 Liberator of the United States 5th Air forces attacked shipping near the island.

Lolobau Island is home to the Lolobau Volcano. It is recorded as having erupted in the 20th century.

== Geography ==
It is a volcanic island of the Bismarck Archipelago group.

It is located just north of New Britain island in the archipelago. Ulawun is an active volcano across the strait from Lolobau Island.

== See also ==
- Bismarck Archipelago topics
- Islands of Papua New Guinea
- List of volcanoes in Papua New Guinea
