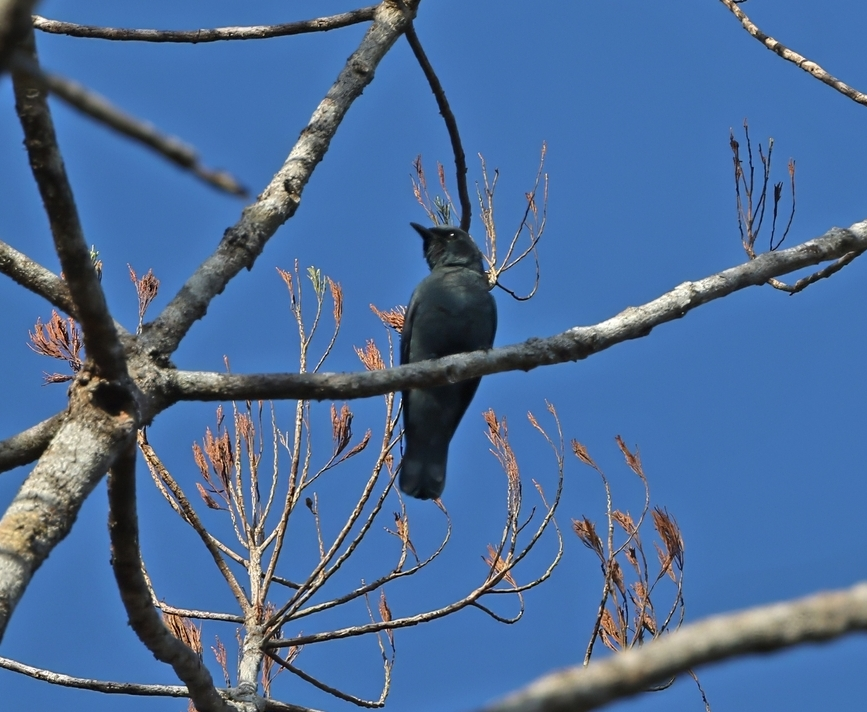

Conservation status
- Least Concern (IUCN 3.1)

Scientific classification
- Kingdom: Animalia
- Phylum: Chordata
- Class: Aves
- Order: Passeriformes
- Family: Campephagidae
- Genus: Edolisoma
- Species: E. sula

Binomial name
- Edolisoma sula Hartert, 1918

Synonyms
- Coracina sula

= Sula cicadabird =

Species of bird

The Sula cicadabird (Edolisoma sula), also known as the Sula cuckooshrike or Moluccan graybird, is a species of bird in the family Campephagidae. It is endemic to Indonesia.

Its natural habitats are subtropical or tropical moist lowland forest and subtropical or tropical moist montane forest.
