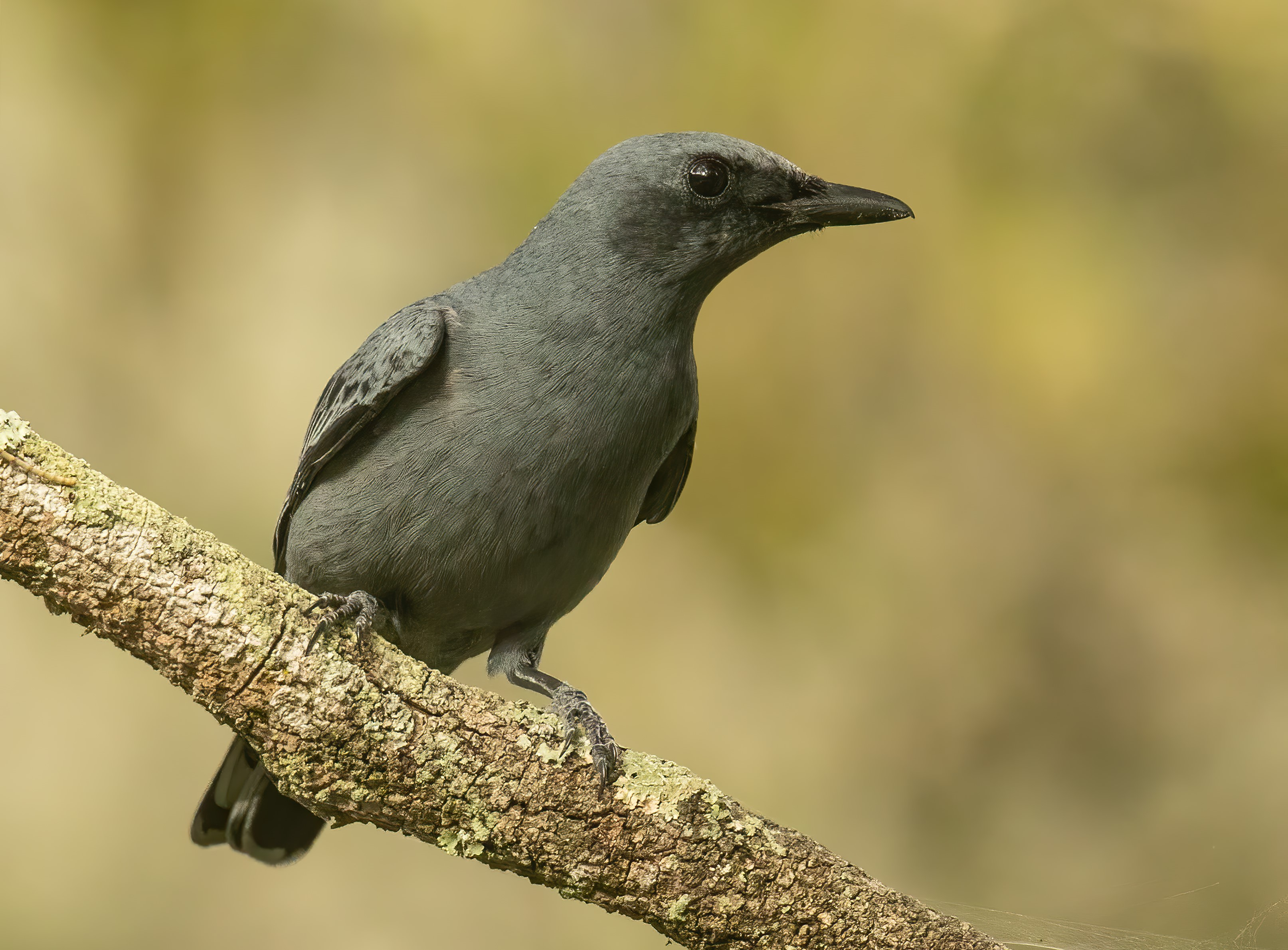

Conservation status
- Least Concern (IUCN 3.1)

Scientific classification
- Kingdom: Animalia
- Phylum: Chordata
- Class: Aves
- Order: Passeriformes
- Family: Campephagidae
- Genus: Edolisoma
- Species: E. tenuirostre

Binomial name
- Edolisoma tenuirostre (Jardine, 1831)

Synonyms
- Coracina tenuirostris

= Sahul cicadabird =

Species of bird

The Sahul cicadabird (Edolisoma tenuirostre), previously known as the common cicadabird or slender-billed cicadabird, is a species of passerine bird in the family Campephagidae. It is found in Australia, New Guinea and the Bismarck Archipelago. Its natural habitats are temperate forest and subtropical or tropical moist lowland forest. The species is placed in the reinstated genus Edolisoma by most authors. The common cicadabird was described as a "great speciator" by Mayr & Diamond (2001); and Pedersen et al. (2018) described how this species rapidly colonized and diversified across the Indo-Pacific island region and Australia in the Pleistocene.

== Subspecies ==
Four subspecies are recognised:

- E. t. aruense Sharpe, 1878 – Aru Islands and Trans-Fly lowlands of southern New Guinea
- E. t. tagulanum Hartert, 1898 – Misima and Tagula Island (Louisiade Archipelago, off southeastern New Guinea)
- E. t. melvillense (Mathews, 1912) – northern Australia (Kimberley region, northern Western Australia, eastward to Cape York Peninsula, northern Queensland)
- E. t. tenuirostre (Jardine, 1831) – breeds eastern Australia (Wet Tropics region, northern Queensland, to central Victoria); winters to New Guinea region, including satellites

Under the name "common cicadabird" this species formerly included 21 subspecies. Based mainly on a molecular phylogenetic study published in 2018, the species was split and seven new species were recognised. The new species are: the Rossel cicadabird, Geelvink cicadabird, Banggai cicadabird, Obi cicadabird, North Moluccan cicadabird, South Moluccan cicadabird and the Timor cicadabird.

== Gallery ==
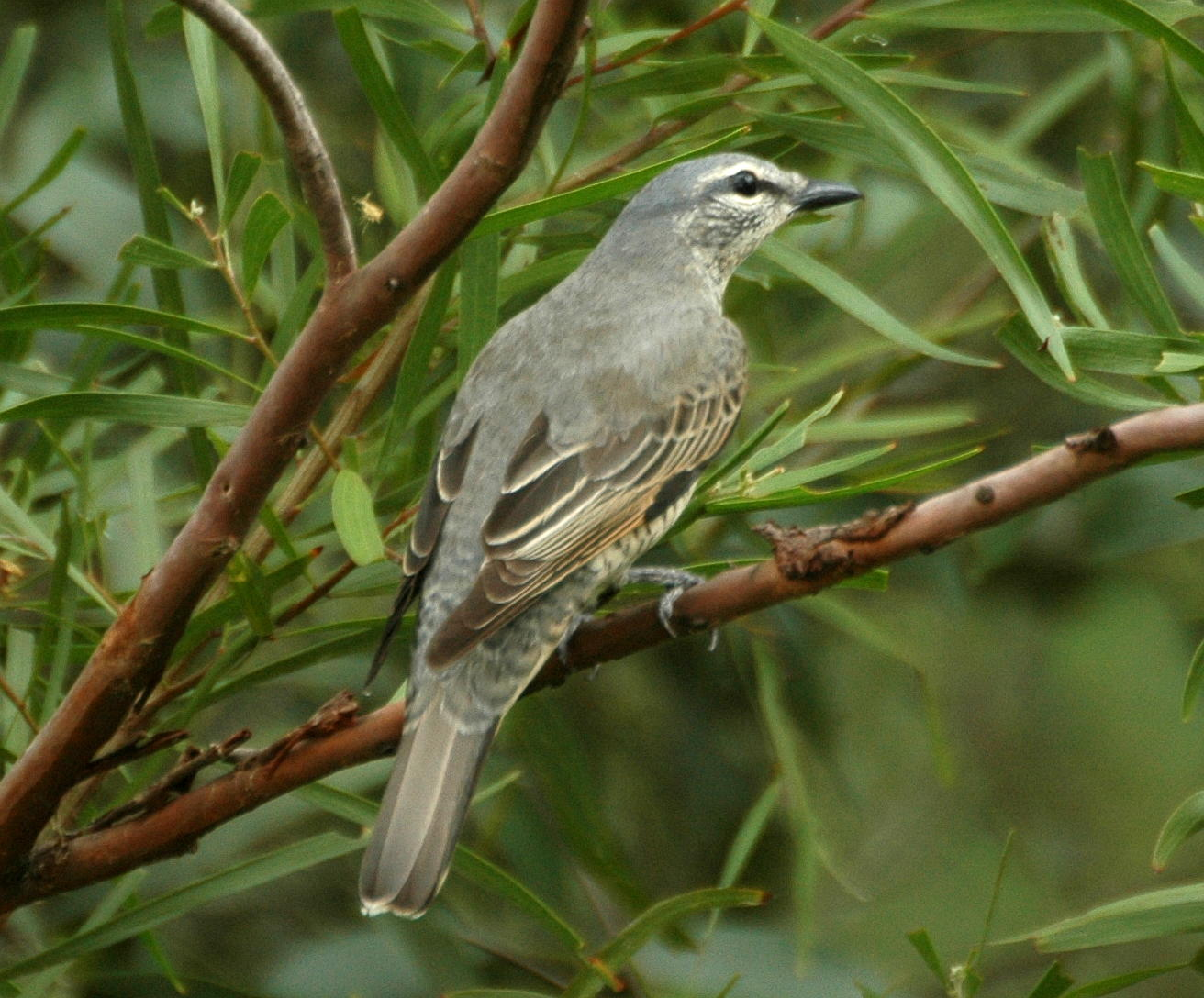
female

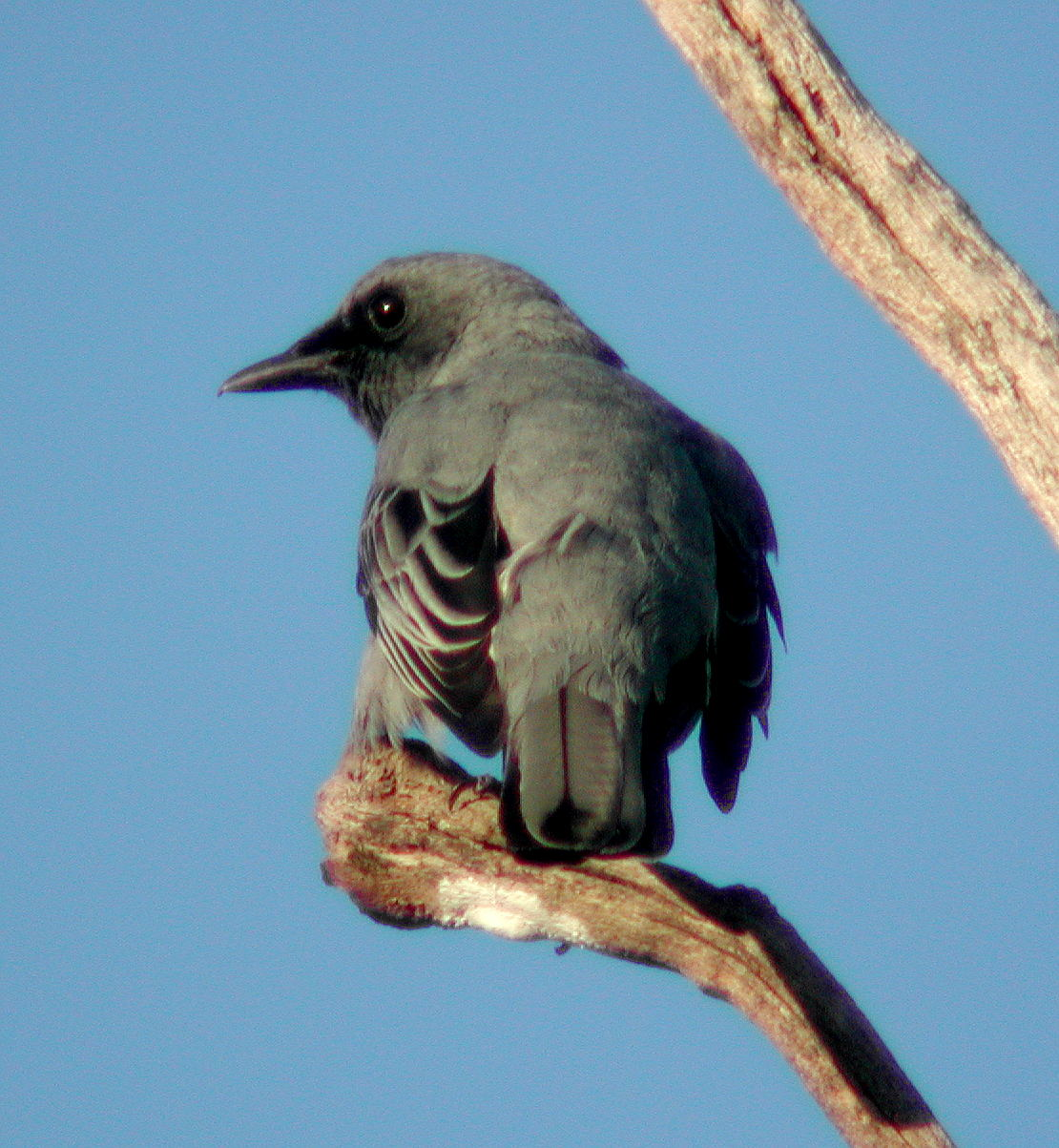
Kobble Creek, southeast Queensland

Adult male and juvenile, Rush Creek, southeast Queensland

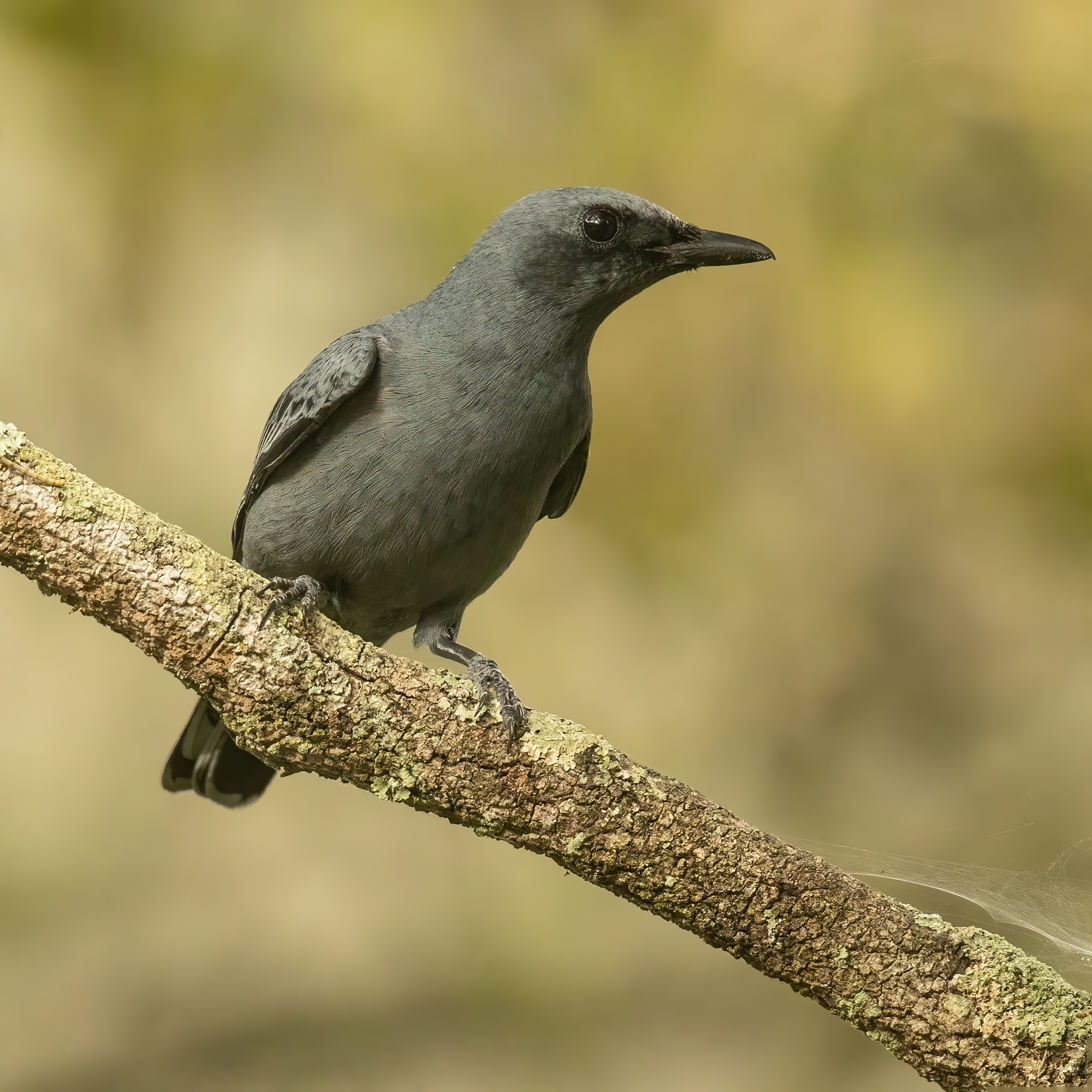
Crossroads Reserve, New South Wales
