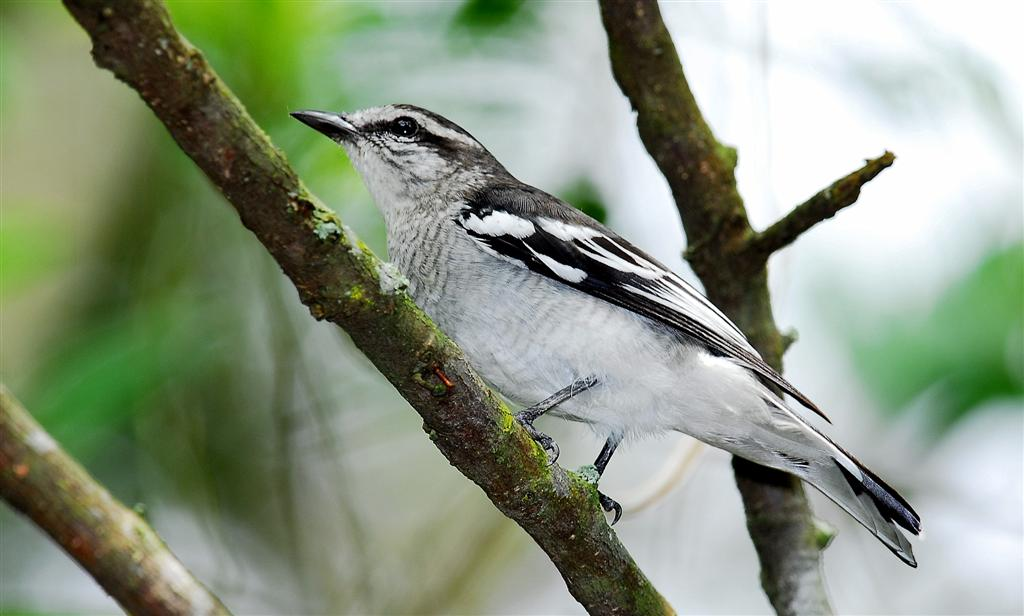
- Male pied triller (Lalage nigra)

Scientific classification
- Kingdom: Animalia
- Phylum: Chordata
- Class: Aves
- Order: Passeriformes
- Family: Campephagidae
- Genus: Lalage

Species
- See text

= Triller =

Trillers

Genus of birds

The trillers are a group of passerine birds belonging to the cuckooshrike family Campephagidae partially making up the genus Lalage. Their name come from the loud trilling calls of the males. There are about 12 species that usually exist in southern Asia and Australasia with a number of species in Pacific islands. They feed mainly on insects and fruit. They build a neat cup-shaped nest high in trees.

Trillers are fairly small birds, about 15 to 20 cm long. They are mainly black, grey and white in colour.

Most species are fairly common but the Samoan triller is considered to be endangered and the Norfolk Island subspecies of the long-tailed triller has gone extinct.

== Taxonomy and systematics ==
=== Extant species ===
- Black-and-white triller, Lalage melanoleuca
- Pied triller, Lalage nigra
- White-rumped triller, Lalage leucopygialis
- White-shouldered triller, Lalage sueurii
- White-winged triller, Lalage tricolor
- Rufous-bellied triller, Lalage aurea
- White-browed triller, Lalage moesta
- Black-browed triller, Lalage atrovirens
- Varied triller, Lalage leucomela
- Mussau triller, Lalage conjuncta
- Polynesian triller, Lalage maculosa
- Samoan triller, Lalage sharpei
- Long-tailed triller, Lalage leucopyga
  - Norfolk triller, Lalage leucopyga leucopyga
