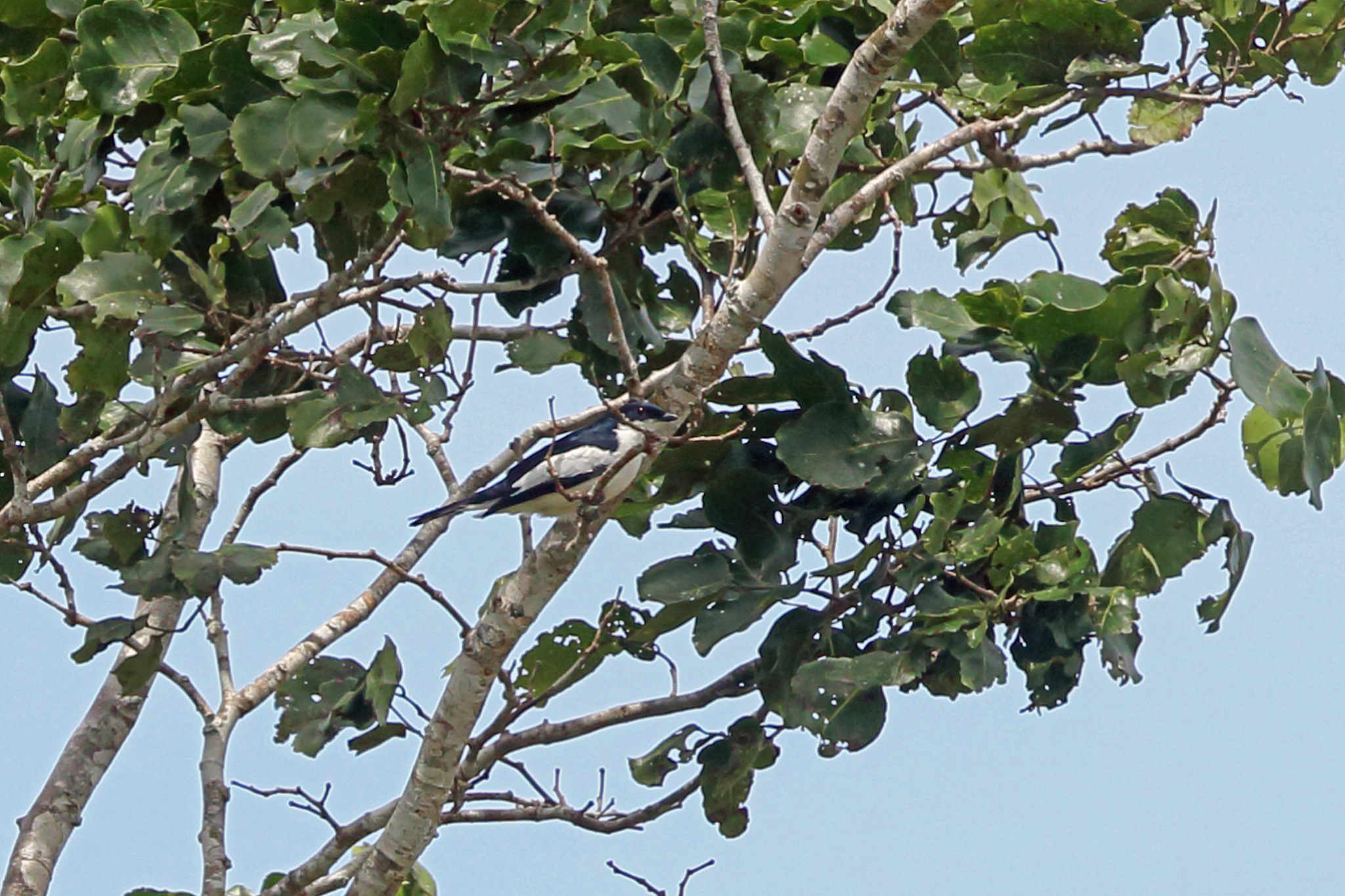

Conservation status
- Near Threatened (IUCN 3.1)

Scientific classification
- Kingdom: Animalia
- Phylum: Chordata
- Class: Aves
- Order: Passeriformes
- Family: Campephagidae
- Genus: Lalage
- Species: L. leucoptera

Binomial name
- Lalage leucoptera (Schlegel, 1871)

= Biak triller =

Species of bird

The Biak triller (Lalage leucoptera) is a species of bird in the family Campephagidae. It is found on Biak. Its natural habitats are subtropical or tropical moist lowland forests and subtropical or tropical mangrove forests. It was formerly considered a subspecies of the black-browed triller (Lalage atrovirens), but was split as a distinct species by the IOC in 2021.
