= Samoan triller =

Conservation status
- Near Threatened (IUCN 3.1)

Scientific classification
- Kingdom: Animalia
- Phylum: Chordata
- Class: Aves
- Order: Passeriformes
- Family: Campephagidae
- Genus: Lalage
- Species: L. sharpei

Binomial name
- Lalage sharpei Rothschild, 1900
- Geographic range of the Samoan triller

Species of bird

The Samoan triller (Lalage sharpei), known in Samoan as miti tae, is a species of bird in the family Campephagidae. It is endemic to Samoa, its natural habitat being forests. It is threatened by habitat loss due to deforestation.

== Taxonomy ==
Lalage sharpei was first described in 1900 by Walter Rothschild, giving the type locality as Upolu. The specific name sharpei is for Richard Bowdler Sharpe.

In 1941, Ernst Mayr and Sidney Dillon Ripley split the species into two subspecies, one encompassing the population on Upolu, the nominotypical subspecies Lalage sharpei sharpei, and one encompassing the population on Savaiʻi, Lalage sharpei tenebrosa, the type for the latter being a male collected in 1924 by R.H. Bock.

== Description ==
The Samoan triller has a length of about 13 cm (5.1 in), smaller than its relative, the Polynesian triller. There is no sexual dimorphism in Samoan trillers, with both sexes possessing similar plumage, a yellow bill, and white iris. The upperparts of the plumage range from a brown to a grey-brown. The underparts, chest, and throat are white, with faint brown bars present on the bird's flanks.

The Samoan triller has been observed foraging in the crowns of forest trees, where it feeds on insects collected from leaves and twigs. It also feeds on fruit. Tts insectivorous behavior helps control forest insect populations and reflects its ecological role as an active canopy feeder. The species has a generation length of about 3.75 years.

== Distribution and habitat ==
The Samoan triller is endemic to Upolu and Savaiʻi, although it is also recorded as having been sighted on the Aleipata Islands, thought to be an infrequent visitor there rather than an established population. It primarily inhabits primary and secondary forest and edges of forest, at up to 1,800 m (5,900 ft) elevation, and is more rarely found in wooded cattle pastures and plantations.

It has been described as being "generally uncommon, though numerous at some sites". It was estimated that the mature population numbered at approximately 20,000 individuals in 2017. The 2024 IUCN Red List assessment for the species listed it as near-threatened due to the combination of a restricted range and ongoing habitat loss due to deforestation caused by logging and land-clearance for agriculture; its estimated extent of occurrence was given as 4,640 km^{2} (1,790 sq mi). Other threats discussed were predation by invasive rats and severe climate events.
