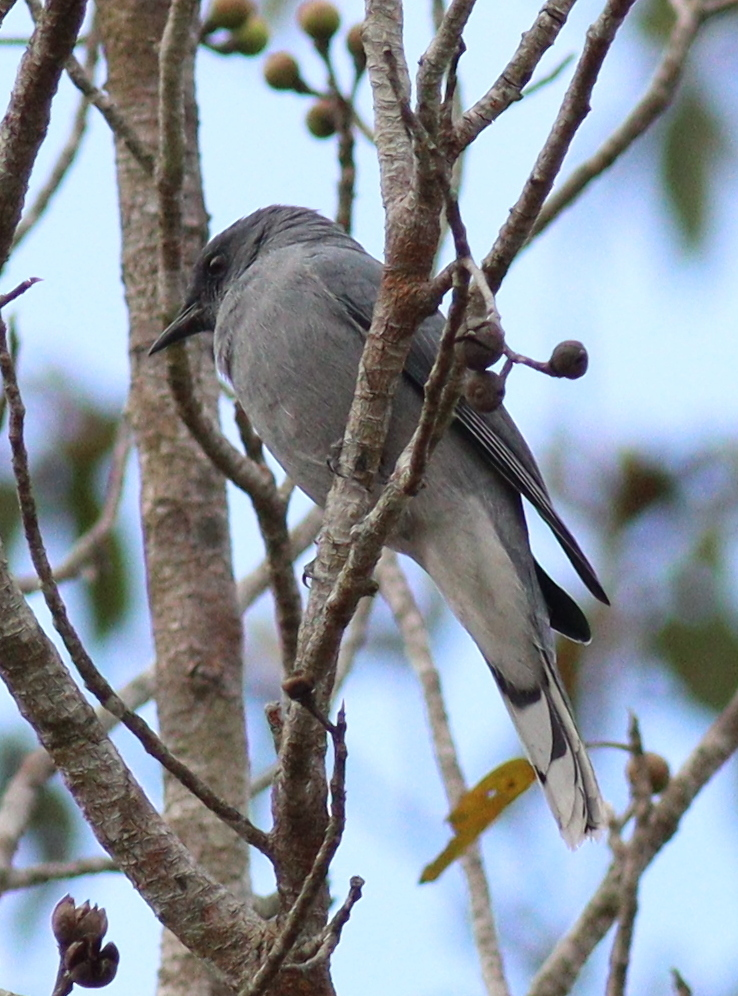
- Indochinese cuckooshrike, Chaiyaphum, Thailand

Conservation status
- Least Concern (IUCN 3.1)

Scientific classification
- Kingdom: Animalia
- Phylum: Chordata
- Class: Aves
- Order: Passeriformes
- Family: Campephagidae
- Genus: Lalage
- Species: L. polioptera

Binomial name
- Lalage polioptera (Sharpe, 1878)

Synonyms
- Campophaga polioptera Coracina polioptera

= Indochinese cuckooshrike =

Species of bird

The Indochinese cuckooshrike (Lalage polioptera) is a species of bird in the family Campephagidae. It is found in Cambodia, Laos, Myanmar, Thailand, and Vietnam. Its natural habitats are subtropical or tropical moist lowland forest and subtropical or tropical moist montane forest.

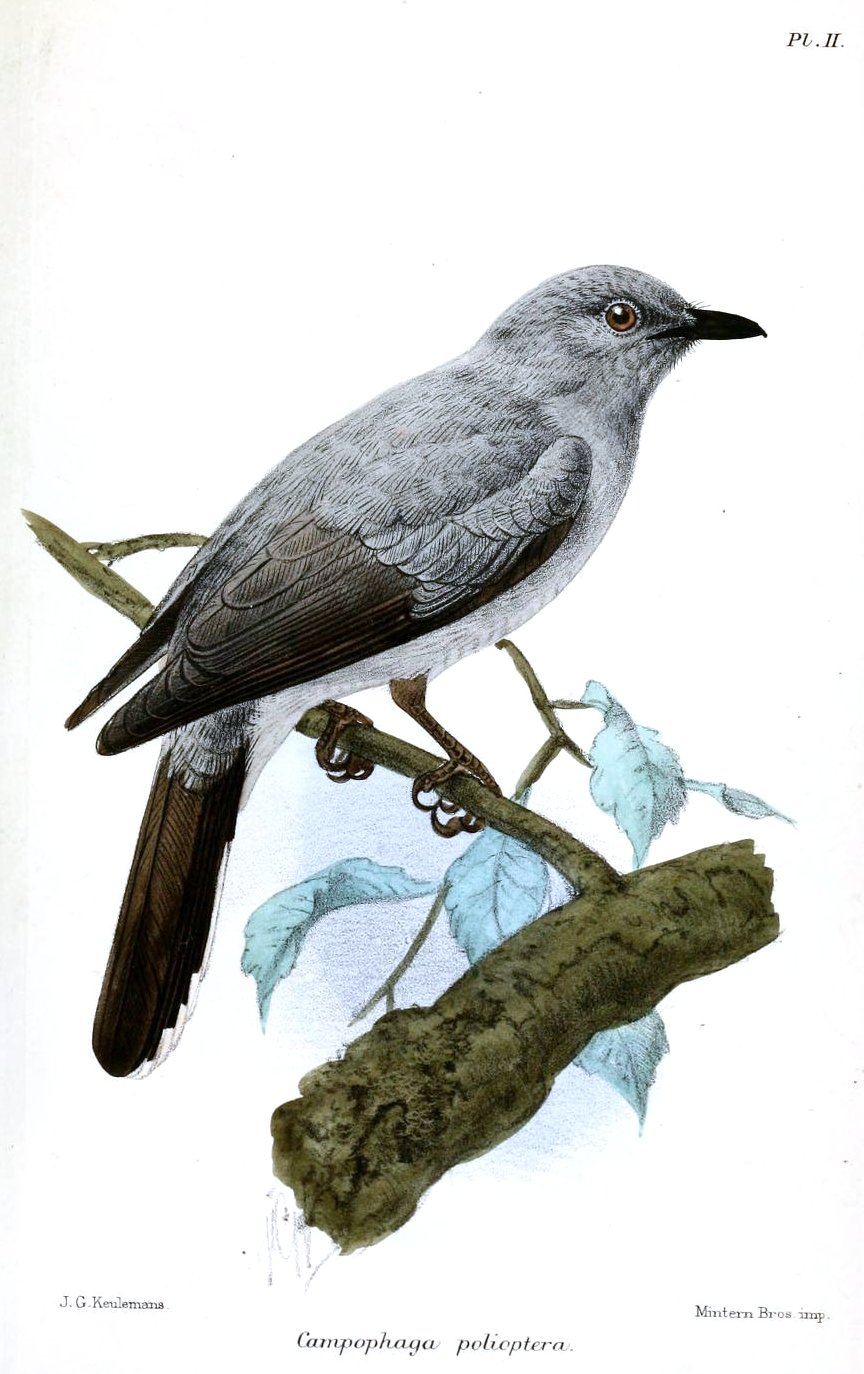
Illustration by Keulemans, 1879
