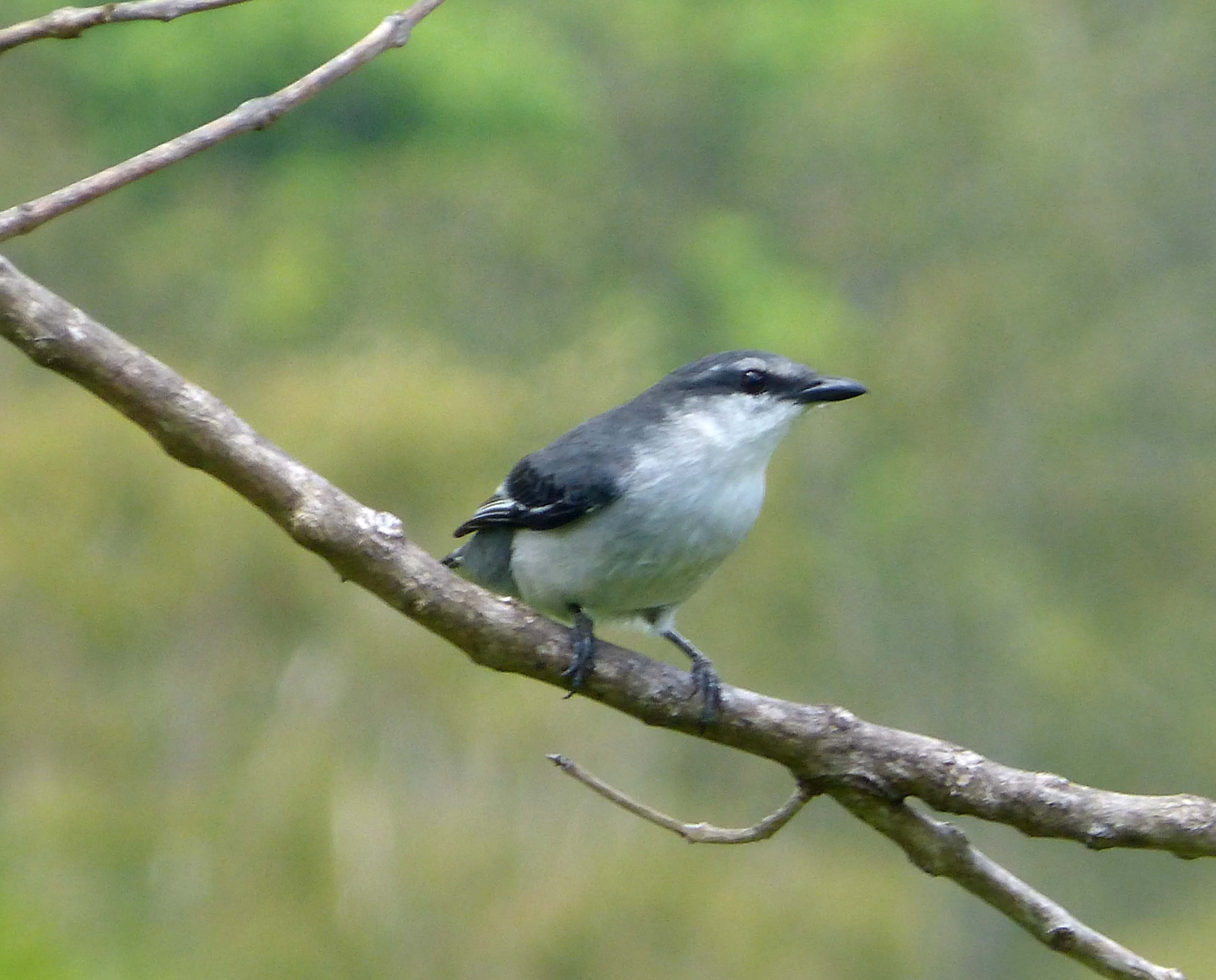
- Wild specimen

Conservation status
- Vulnerable (IUCN 3.1)

Scientific classification
- Kingdom: Animalia
- Phylum: Chordata
- Class: Aves
- Order: Passeriformes
- Family: Campephagidae
- Genus: Lalage
- Species: L. typica

Binomial name
- Lalage typica (Hartlaub, 1865)

Synonyms
- Coracina typica

= Mauritius cuckooshrike =

Species of bird

The Mauritius cuckooshrike (Lalage typica) is a species of bird in the family Campephagidae. It is endemic to Mauritius.

Its natural habitat is subtropical or tropical moist lowland forests. It is threatened by habitat loss.
