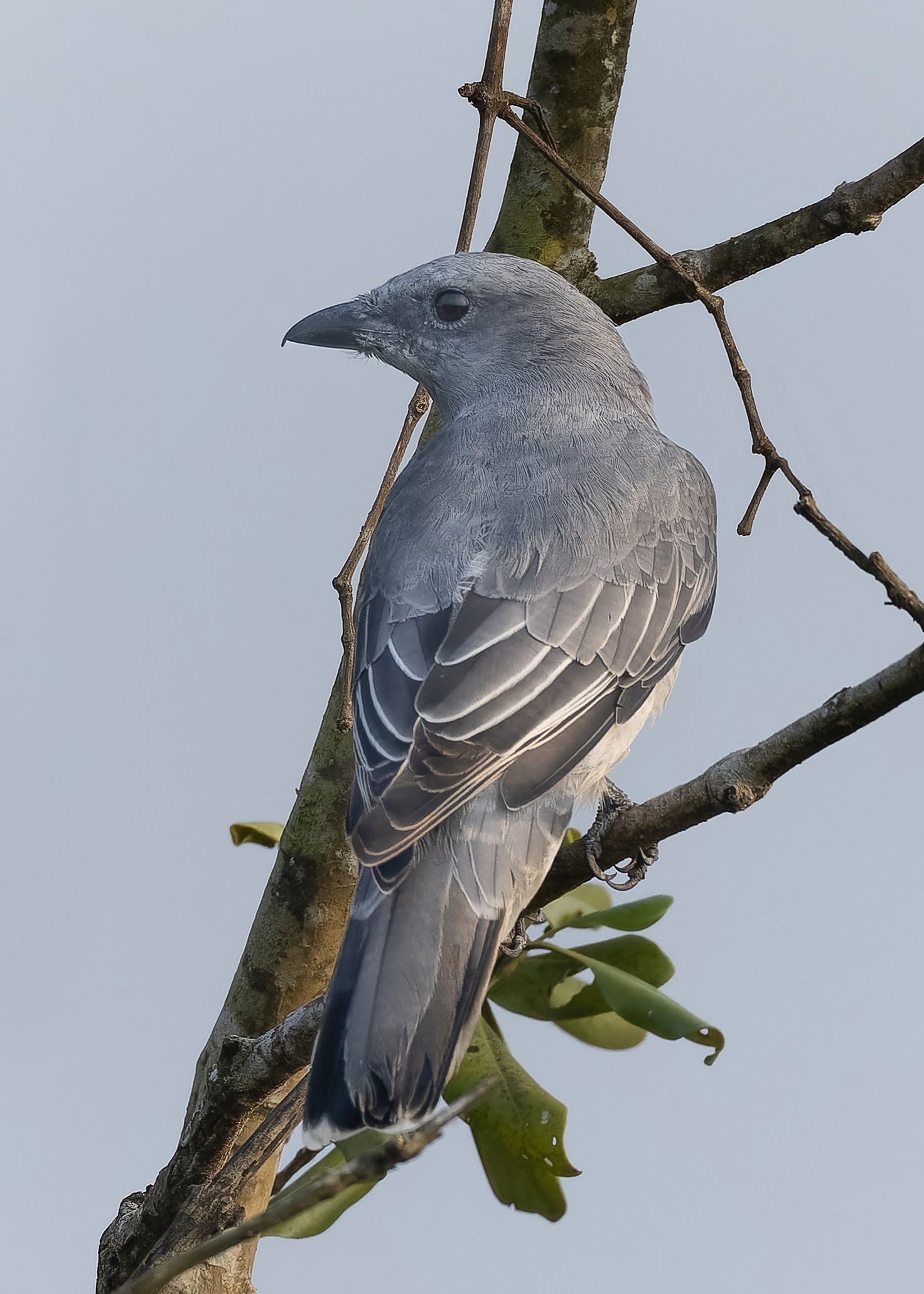
- Lalage melaschistos (female) in Sundarbans National Park, West Bengal, India.

Conservation status
- Least Concern (IUCN 3.1)

Scientific classification
- Kingdom: Animalia
- Phylum: Chordata
- Class: Aves
- Order: Passeriformes
- Family: Campephagidae
- Genus: Lalage
- Species: L. melaschistos

Binomial name
- Lalage melaschistos (Hodgson, 1836)

Synonyms
- Coracina melaschistos

= Black-winged cuckooshrike =

Species of bird

The black-winged cuckooshrike (Lalage melaschistos), also known as lesser grey cuckooshrike or dark grey cuckooshrike, is a species of cuckooshrike found in South to Southeast Asia. Despite the name, they (cuckooshrikes) are unrelated to either shrikes or cuckoos. They have broad based bills with grey upper parts, black wings, white vent, graduated white-tipped tails, black bills and legs. Females are overall lighter in all taxa.

== Distribution ==
They breed in summer in mountains from 300–2450 meters and migrate altitudinally or south in winter. It is distributed from Northeast Pakistan through the lower Himalayan region (Uttarakhand, Nepal, Arunachal Pradesh and into the hills of NE Myanmar continuing to China and Southeast Asia. It winters in the foothills, occasionally longer distances south west to northern parts of peninsular India and east to Orissa, Bengal and Bangladesh, but may travel as far south as Kerala).

Habitat: Breeds in deciduous and broad-leaved evergreen forest but winters in open forest, groves, singly or in pairs. They are also known to join mixed feeding parties. Their diet consists mainly of caterpillars, beetles and other bugs.

== Description ==
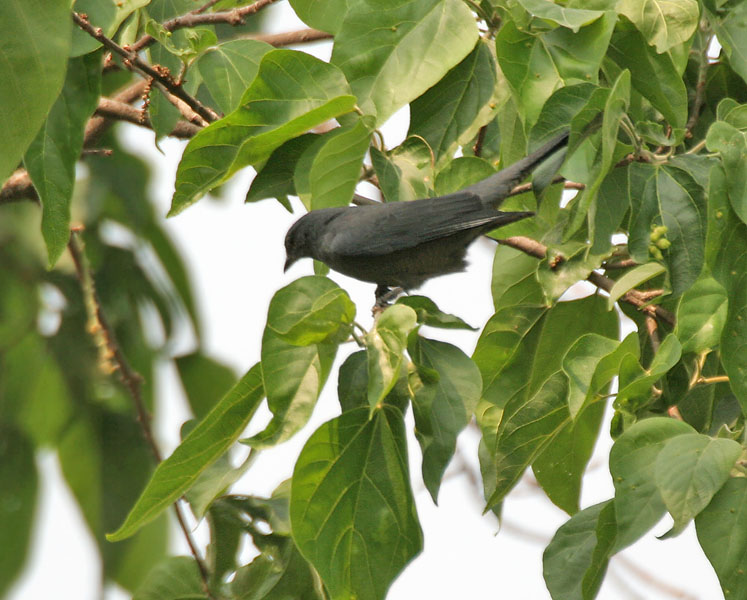
Black-winged cuckooshrike at Jayanti in Buxa Tiger Reserve in Jalpaiguri district of West Bengal, India

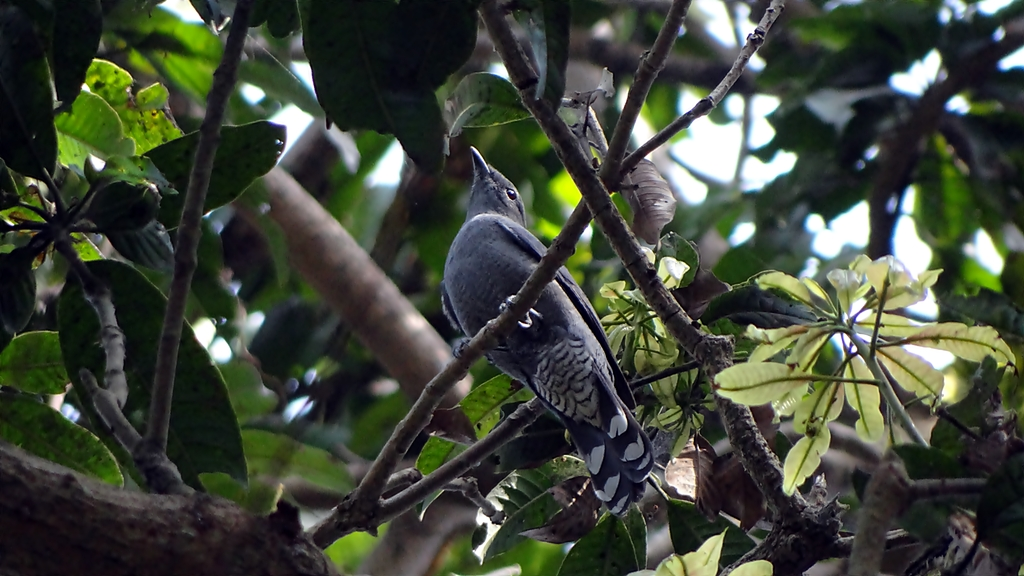
Female

A medium-sized, dark cuckoo-shrike with unbarred, grey underparts.

Male: dark grey above; contrasting black wings and tail. Wide white feather tips on underside of tail.
Female: Palers with faint barring on underside
Call: Loud twit twit to we, descending in scale.
Diet: mainly invertebrates.
Nests in tree.
