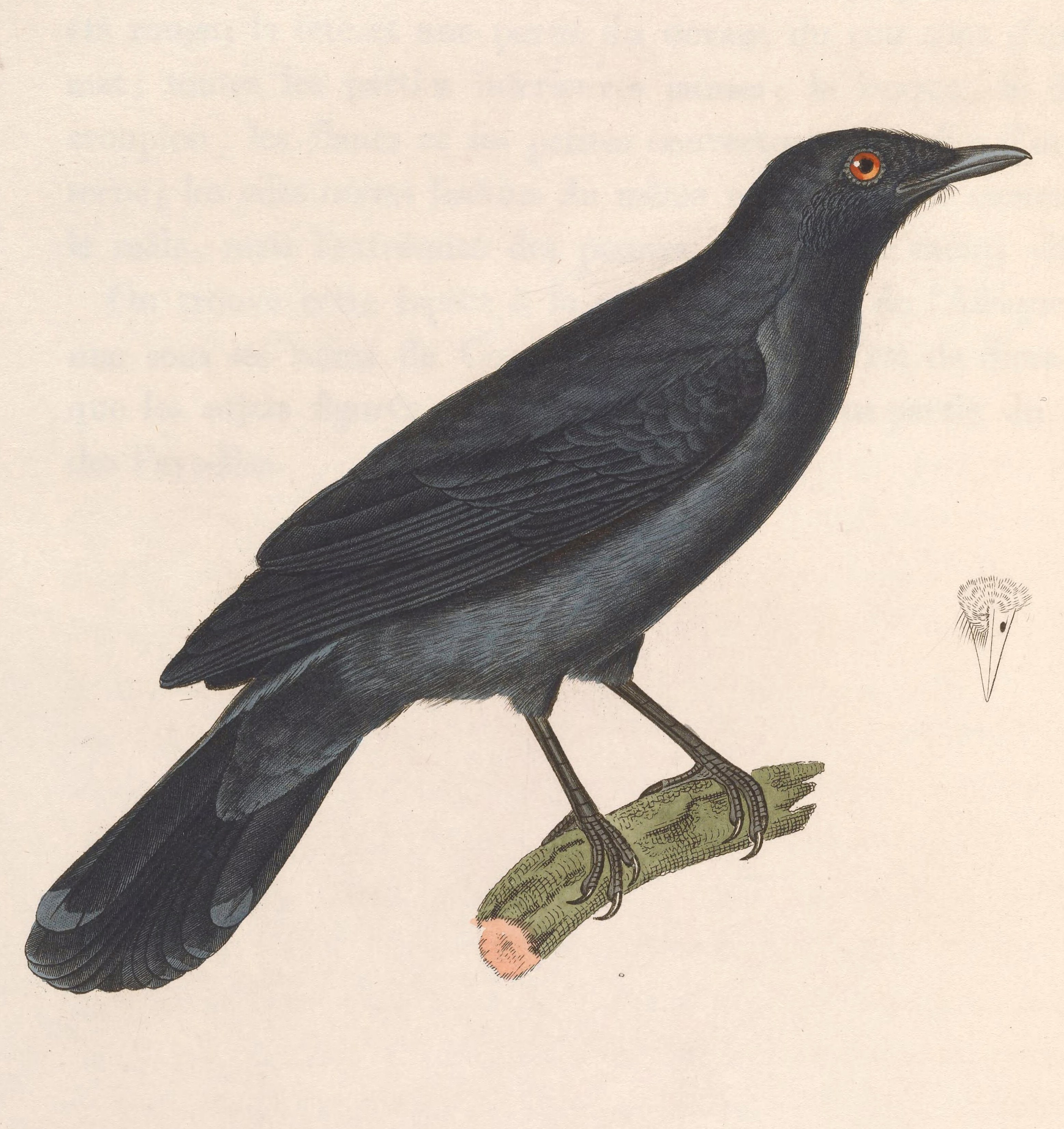

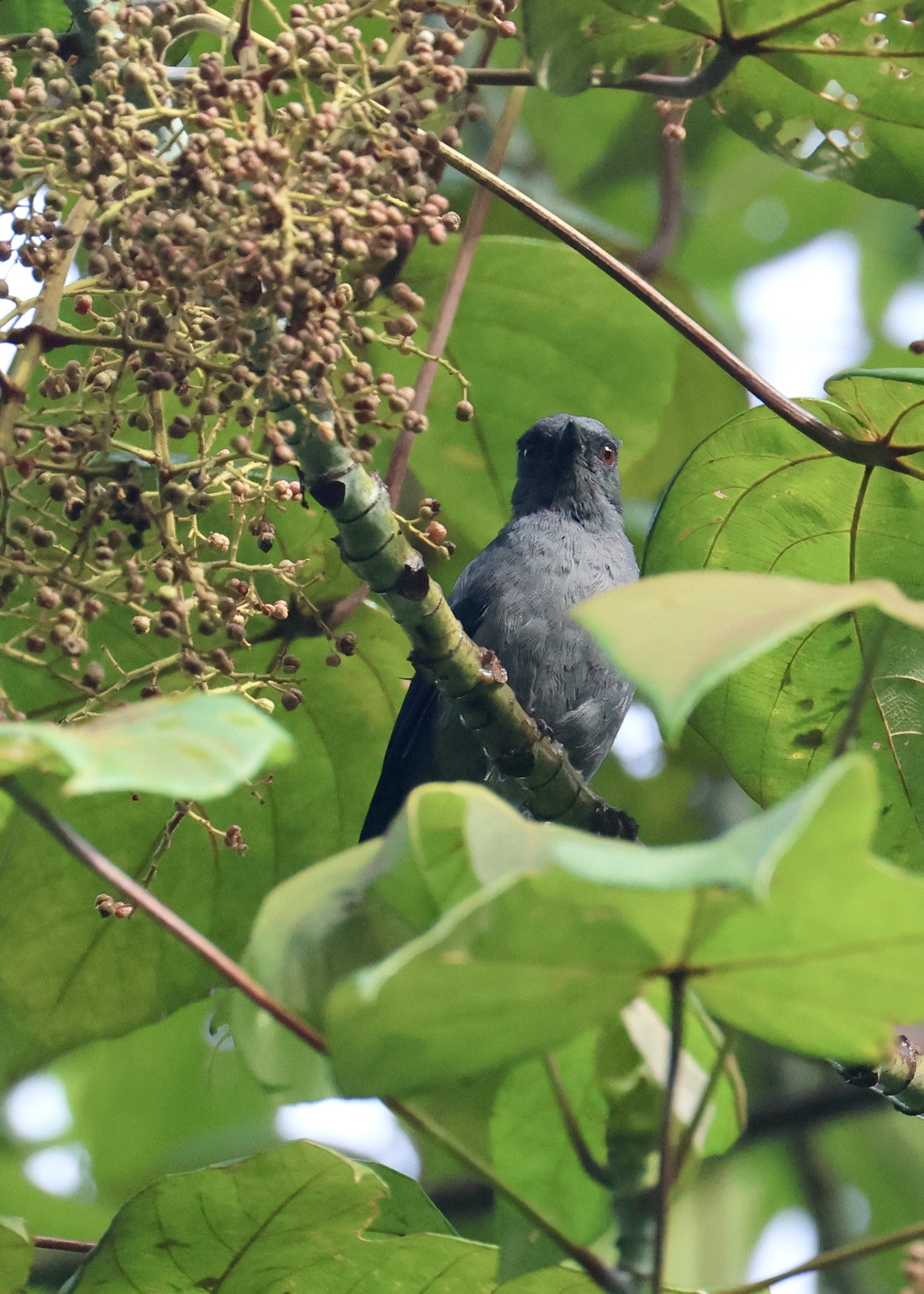

Conservation status
- Least Concern (IUCN 3.1)

Scientific classification
- Kingdom: Animalia
- Phylum: Chordata
- Class: Aves
- Order: Passeriformes
- Family: Campephagidae
- Genus: Lalage
- Species: L. fimbriata

Binomial name
- Lalage fimbriata (Temminck, 1824)

Synonyms
- Coracina fimbriata

= Lesser cuckooshrike =

Species of bird

The lesser cuckooshrike (Lalage fimbriata) is a species of bird in the family Campephagidae. It is found in Brunei, Indonesia, Malaysia, Myanmar, Singapore, and Thailand.

It is small, short-tailed, shrike-like bird, 20 cm in length. The male is dark grey, paler below with contrasting dark, blackish flight feathers, and a blackish head. The tail is also black with light tips, ranging from white to greyish. The female is paler with pale barring on underside. Immature birds are browner with grey and white barring or spotting on the pale breast. The iris is brown, and the bill and feet are black.

It is resident across the Malay Peninsula and the Greater Sundas, where it is an occasional bird of lowland and hill forest (up to 1000 m on Sumatra, and 1500 m on Java). The lesser cuckooshrike prefers primary forest but also visits surrounding cultivated areas and plantations and gardens. It generally keeps to treetops, where it can be seen singly or in pairs and often in mixed flocks. In winter small flocks form. Its diet consists of insects.
