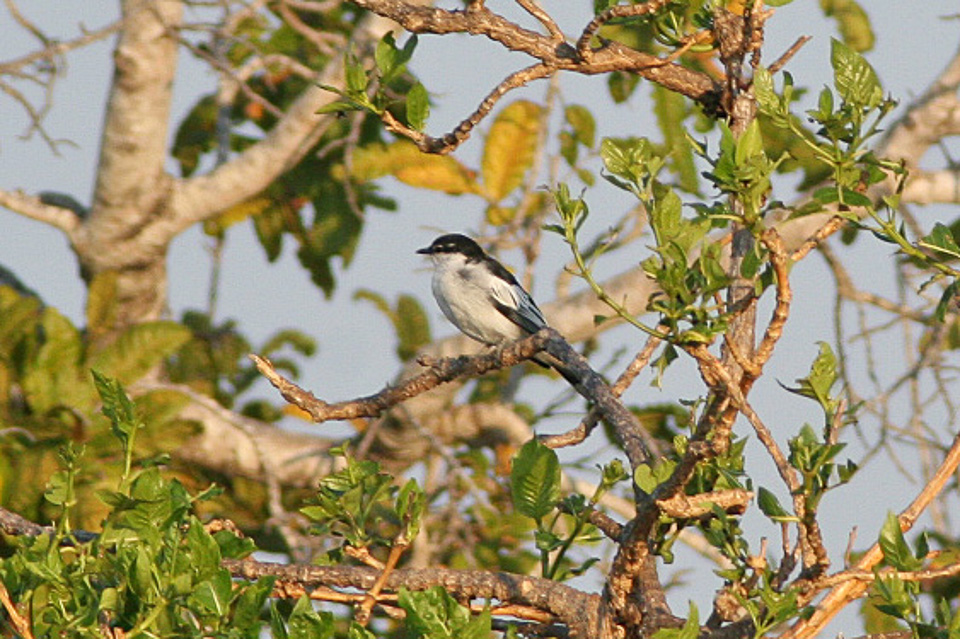

Conservation status
- Least Concern (IUCN 3.1)

Scientific classification
- Kingdom: Animalia
- Phylum: Chordata
- Class: Aves
- Order: Passeriformes
- Family: Campephagidae
- Genus: Lalage
- Species: L. sueurii

Binomial name
- Lalage sueurii (Vieillot, 1818)

= White-shouldered triller =

Species of bird

The white-shouldered triller (Lalage sueurii) is a passerine bird belonging to the triller genus Lalage in the cuckoo-shrike family Campephagidae. It is found in Indonesia and East Timor. The white-winged triller (L. tricolor) of Australia and New Guinea was formerly included in this species but is now treated as a separate species.

It is a fairly small bird, 17 centimetres in length. The bill is grey with a black tip and the legs and feet are black. The male is mainly black above and white below. It has a grey rump, white stripe over the eye, white wing-patches and white on the outer tail-feathers. Females have a similar pattern to the males but are brown instead of black above and have fine black barring on the underparts.

The pied triller is similar but is slightly smaller with a broader stripe above the eye and more white in the wing. The male white-winged triller has no white stripe over the eye.

The song of the white-shouldered triller is a metallic whistling which is sometimes given in flight. It also utters a rapid series of harsh notes.

It occurs in eastern Java, southern Sulawesi, Bali and on the Lesser Sunda Islands. It inhabits open woodland, savannas and agricultural land in dry, lowland areas. It feeds on insects, often swooping down from a perch to catch them on the ground.
