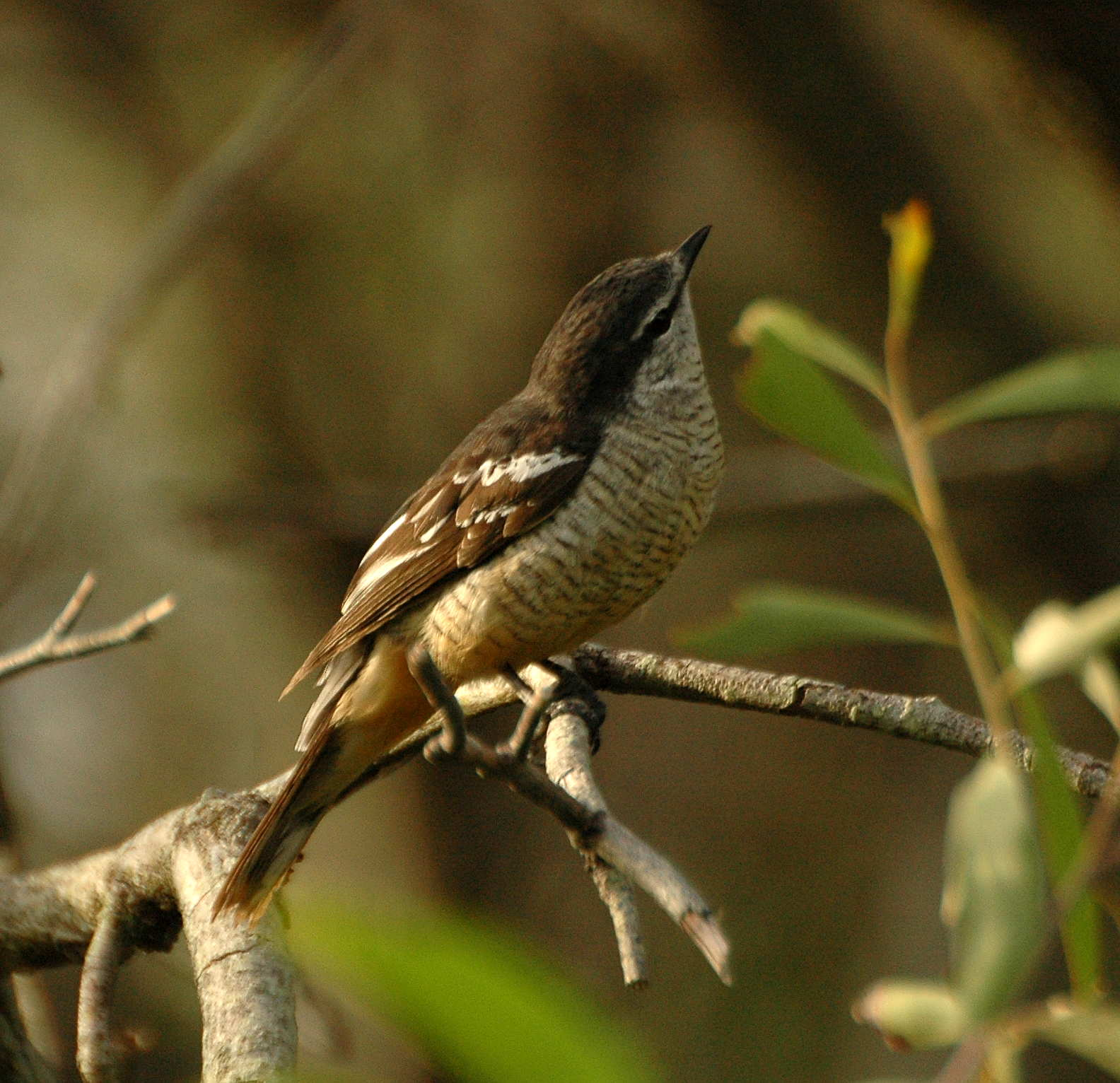

Conservation status
- Least Concern (IUCN 3.1)

Scientific classification
- Kingdom: Animalia
- Phylum: Chordata
- Class: Aves
- Order: Passeriformes
- Family: Campephagidae
- Genus: Lalage
- Species: L. leucomela

Binomial name
- Lalage leucomela (Vigors & Horsfield, 1827)
- Geographic range of the varied triller

= Varied triller =

Species of bird

The varied triller (Lalage leucomela) like its better-known relative the white-winged triller, is a smaller member of the cuckoo-shrike family, Campephagidae. Varied trillers prefer warm, reasonably moist environments and are found in New Guinea and the Bismarck Archipelago, along much of the tropical and sub-tropical coastal hinterland of eastern Australia, from about the Sydney area to the tip of Cape York Peninsula, in the moister part of the Kimberley, and throughout the Top End.

Common to very common in the north, they are uncommon to rare in the colder south. Typical habitat is rainforest, vine forest, riverine thickets, eucalypt forest and woodland, with a particular preference for the border areas between closed and open forests.

Varied trillers work their way slowly and methodically through foliage at any level (sometimes on the ground), searching in pairs or small groups for insects and fruit, and making repeated rolling contact calls almost continuously.

An alternative name is Pied Caterpillar-eater (Karua Leucomela)

The Mussau triller (L. conjuncta) was formerly considered a subspecies.

== Gallery ==
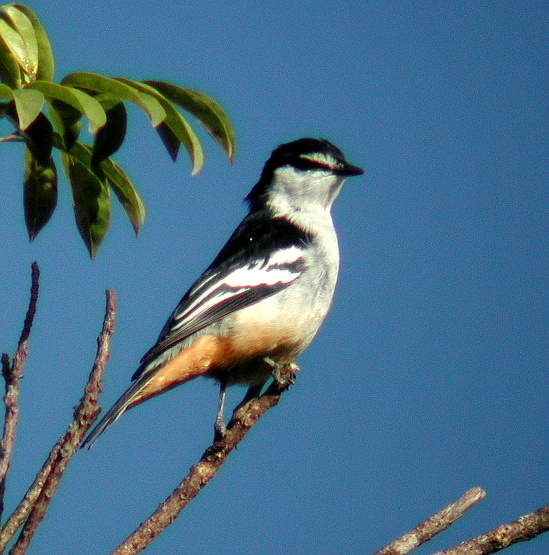
Dayboro, SE Queensland

Rush Creek, SE Queensland
