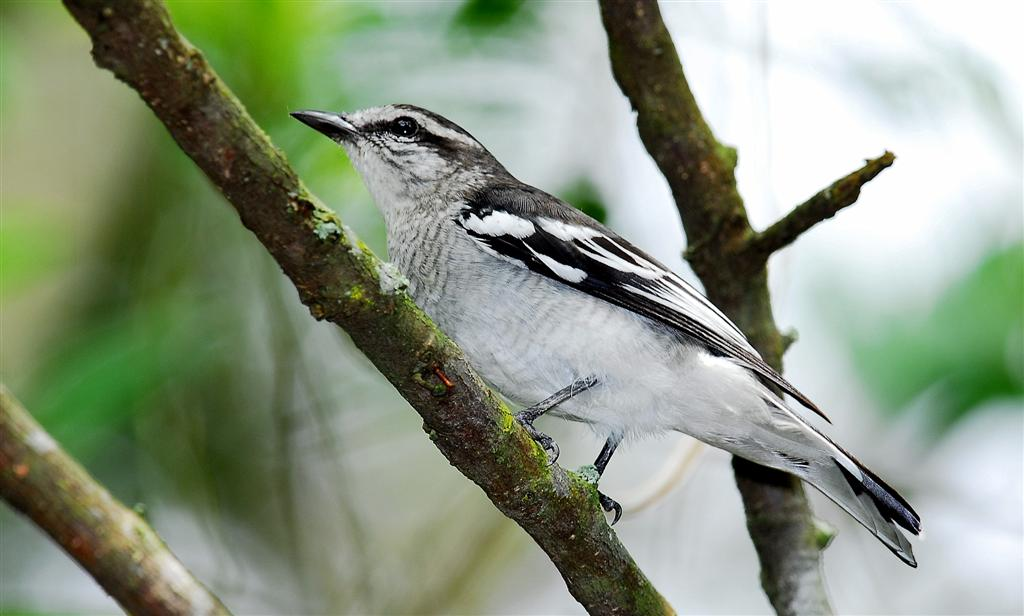
- Male pied triller (Lalage nigra)

Scientific classification
- Kingdom: Animalia
- Phylum: Chordata
- Class: Aves
- Order: Passeriformes
- Family: Campephagidae
- Genus: Lalage; F. Boie, 1826

Type species
- Turdus orientalis Gmelin, JF, 1788

= Lalage (bird) =

Genus of birds

Lalage is a genus of passerine birds belonging to the cuckooshrike family Campephagidae, many of which are commonly known as trillers. There are about 20 species which occur in southern Asia and Australasia with a number of species on Pacific islands. They feed mainly on insects and fruit. They build a neat cup-shaped nest high in a tree.

They are fairly small birds, about 15 to 20 cm long. They are mainly black, grey and white in colour.

Most species are fairly common but the Samoan triller is considered to be near threatened and the Norfolk Island subspecies of the long-tailed triller has become extinct.

== Taxonomy ==
The genus Lalage was introduced in 1826 by the German zoologist Friedrich Boie to accommodate a single species, Turdus orientalis Gmelin, JF, 1788, a junior synonym of Turdus niger Pennant, 1781, the pied triller. The genus name is from Ancient Greek lagages, an unidentified bird mentioned by the Greek lexicographer Hesychius of Alexandria.

The genus now includes six species that were formerly assigned to the genus Coracina. A molecular phylogenetic study published in 2010 found that the species form part of the clade that contain members of the genus Lalage.

The genus contains 20 species:

- Black-and-white triller, Lalage melanoleuca
- Pied triller, Lalage nigra
- White-rumped triller, Lalage leucopygialis
- White-shouldered triller, Lalage sueurii
- White-winged triller, Lalage tricolor
- Rufous-bellied triller, Lalage aurea
- White-browed triller, Lalage moesta
- Black-browed triller, Lalage atrovirens
- Biak triller, Lalage leucoptera
- Varied triller, Lalage leucomela
- Mussau triller, Lalage conjuncta
- Polynesian triller, Lalage maculosa
- Samoan triller, Lalage sharpei
- Long-tailed triller, Lalage leucopyga
  - Norfolk triller, Lalage leucopyga leucopyga
- Black-winged cuckooshrike, Lalage melaschistos
- Black-headed cuckooshrike, Lalage melanoptera
- Indochinese cuckooshrike, Lalage polioptera
- Lesser cuckooshrike, Lalage fimbriata
- Mauritius cuckooshrike, Lalage typica
- Reunion cuckooshrike, Lalage newtoni

=== Former species ===
Formerly, some authorities also considered the following species (or subspecies) as species within the genus Lalage:

- Buff-bellied monarch (as L. banksiana)
- Black-throated shrikebill (as L. nigrogularis)
