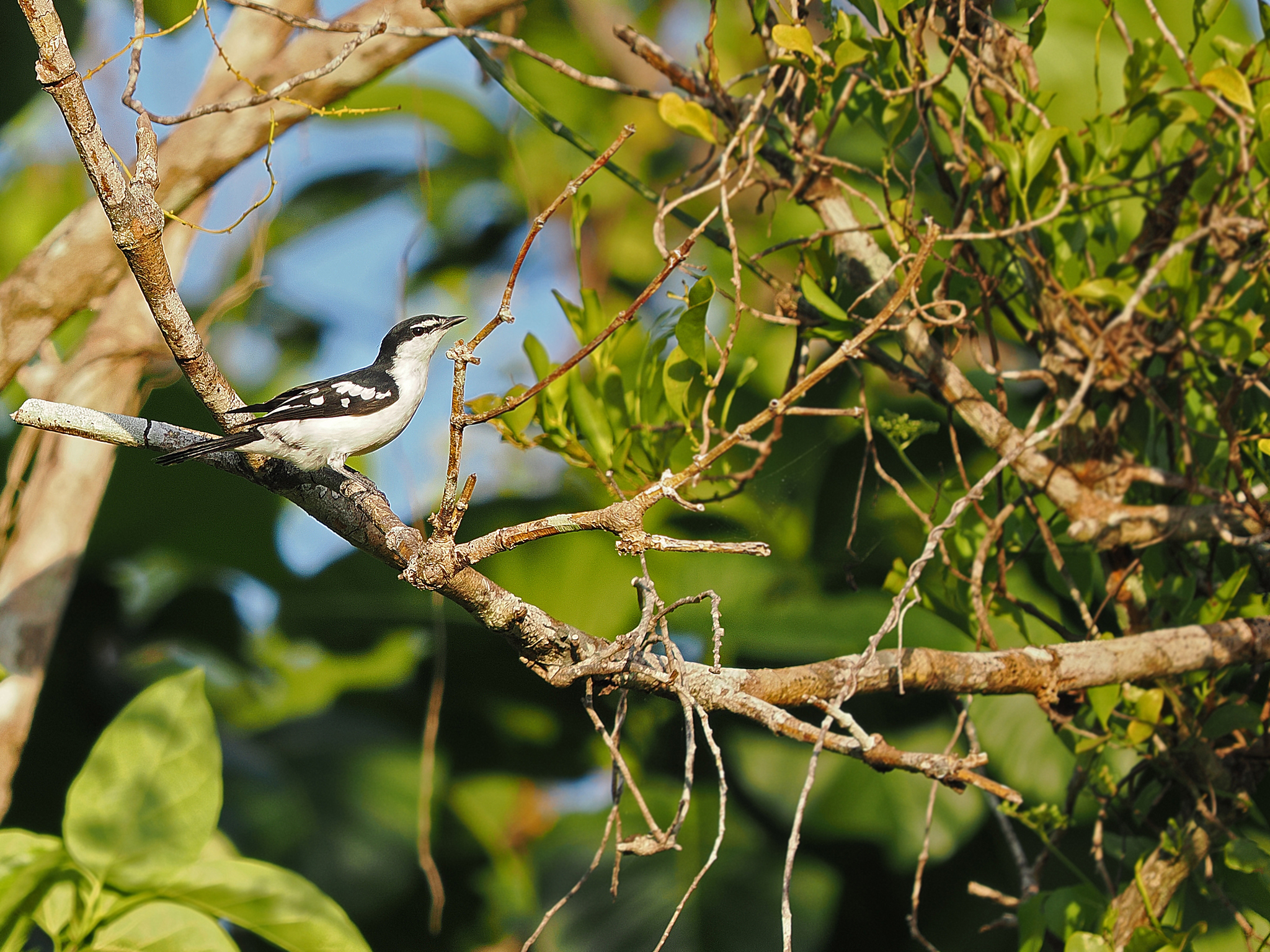

Conservation status
- Least Concern (IUCN 3.1)

Scientific classification
- Kingdom: Animalia
- Phylum: Chordata
- Class: Aves
- Order: Passeriformes
- Family: Campephagidae
- Genus: Lalage
- Species: L. moesta

Binomial name
- Lalage moesta Sclater, PL, 1883

= White-browed triller =

Species of bird

The white-browed triller (Lalage moesta) is a species of bird in the family Campephagidae. It is endemic to Indonesia, where it occurs in the Tanimbar Islands.
