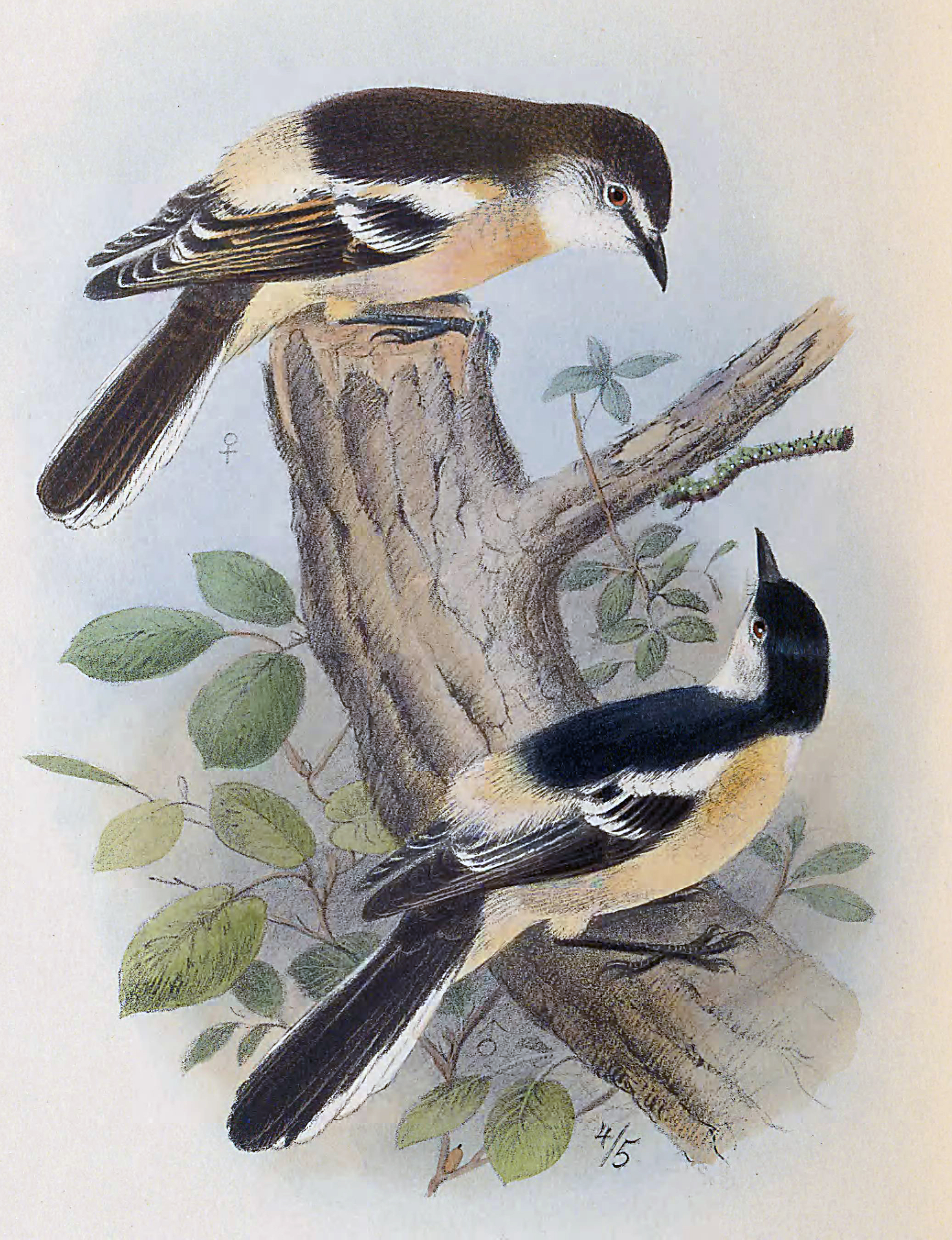
- Illustration by Henrik Gronvold

Conservation status
- Extinct (EPBC Act)

Scientific classification
- Kingdom: Animalia
- Phylum: Chordata
- Class: Aves
- Order: Passeriformes
- Family: Campephagidae
- Genus: Lalage
- Species: L. leucopyga
- Subspecies: L. l. leucopyga

Trinomial name
- Lalage leucopyga leucopyga (Gould, 1838)

= Norfolk triller =

Extinct subspecies of bird

The Norfolk triller (Lalage leucopyga leucopyga) is an extinct small passerine bird in the cuckooshrike family, Campephagidae. It is the extinct nominate subspecies of the long-tailed triller which was endemic to Norfolk Island, an Australian territory in the Tasman Sea between Australia and New Zealand. Little is known of its biology.

== Description ==
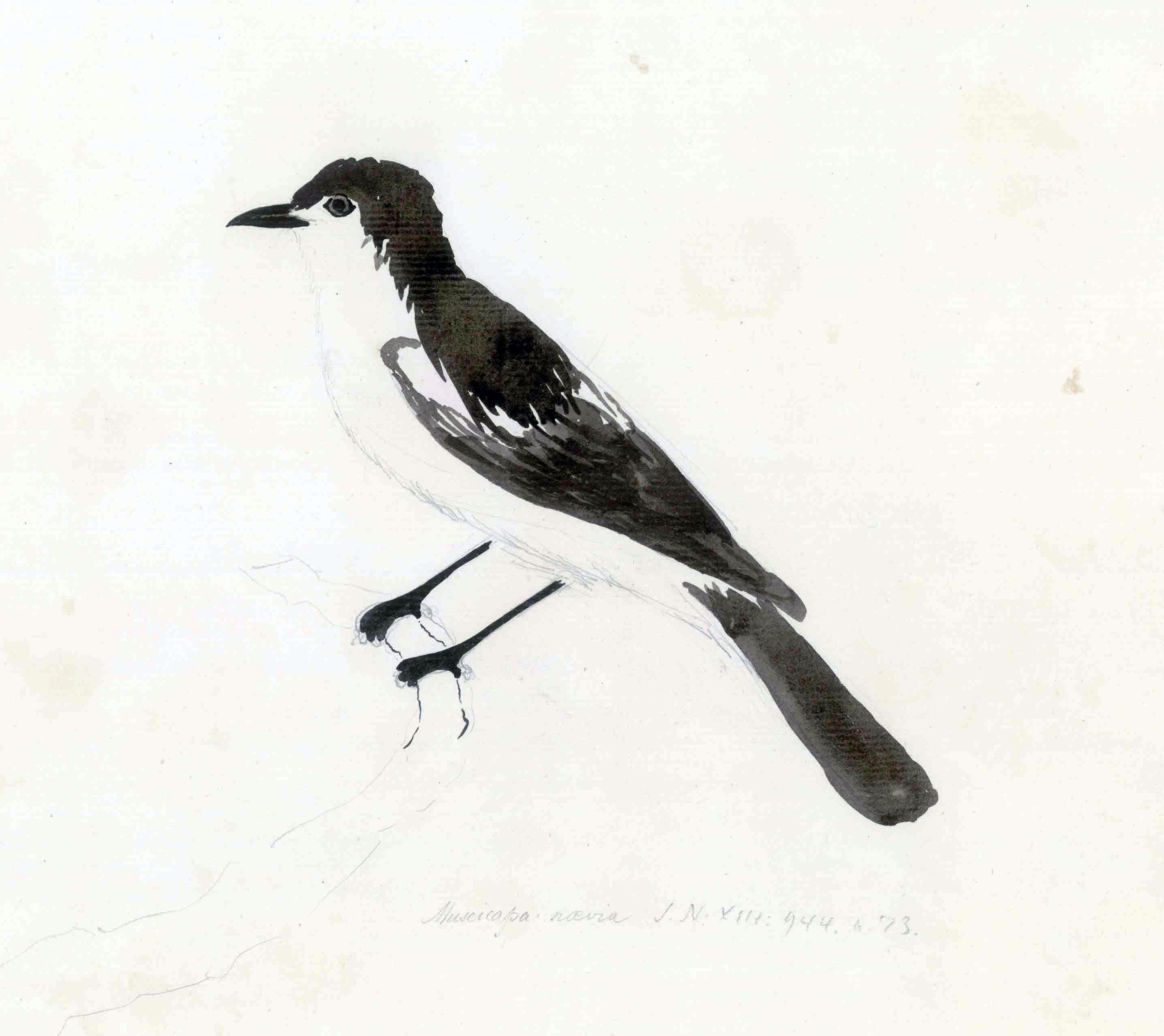
Illustration by Georg Forster from the 1770s

The Norfolk triller was similar to other subspecies of the long-tailed triller, though it was slightly larger and had a richer buff wash on the underparts and rump and a broader white tip to the outer rectrices.

== Behaviour ==
=== Breeding ===
Breeding was recorded in September, with eggs in December and February. Nests were shallow and cup-shaped, made of lichen, moss and fibrous roots, and lined with finer material. The clutch was usually two eggs.

== Extinction ==
Despite being recorded as 'abundant' in 1941, the triller was last recorded in 1942. The cause of its extinction was probably predation by black rats combined with clearance of its habitat, Norfolk Island's native subtropical rainforest.

There are specimens of this bird held in the museums at Leiden, Vienna, Tring and in the H. L. White Collection at Melbourne.
