= Mussau triller =

Conservation status
- Vulnerable (IUCN 3.1)

Scientific classification
- Kingdom: Animalia
- Phylum: Chordata
- Class: Aves
- Order: Passeriformes
- Family: Campephagidae
- Genus: Lalage
- Species: L. conjuncta

Binomial name
- Lalage conjuncta Rothschild & Hartert, 1924

Species of bird

The Mussau triller (Lalage conjuncta) is a smaller member of the cuckooshrike family, Campephagidae. It was formerly considered a subspecies of the varied triller. It is found on the St Matthias Islands in the Bismarck Archipelago. Photographed and sound-recorded for the first time in 2024, the species is now thought to be restricted to the centre of the island and may be at risk due to logging.
