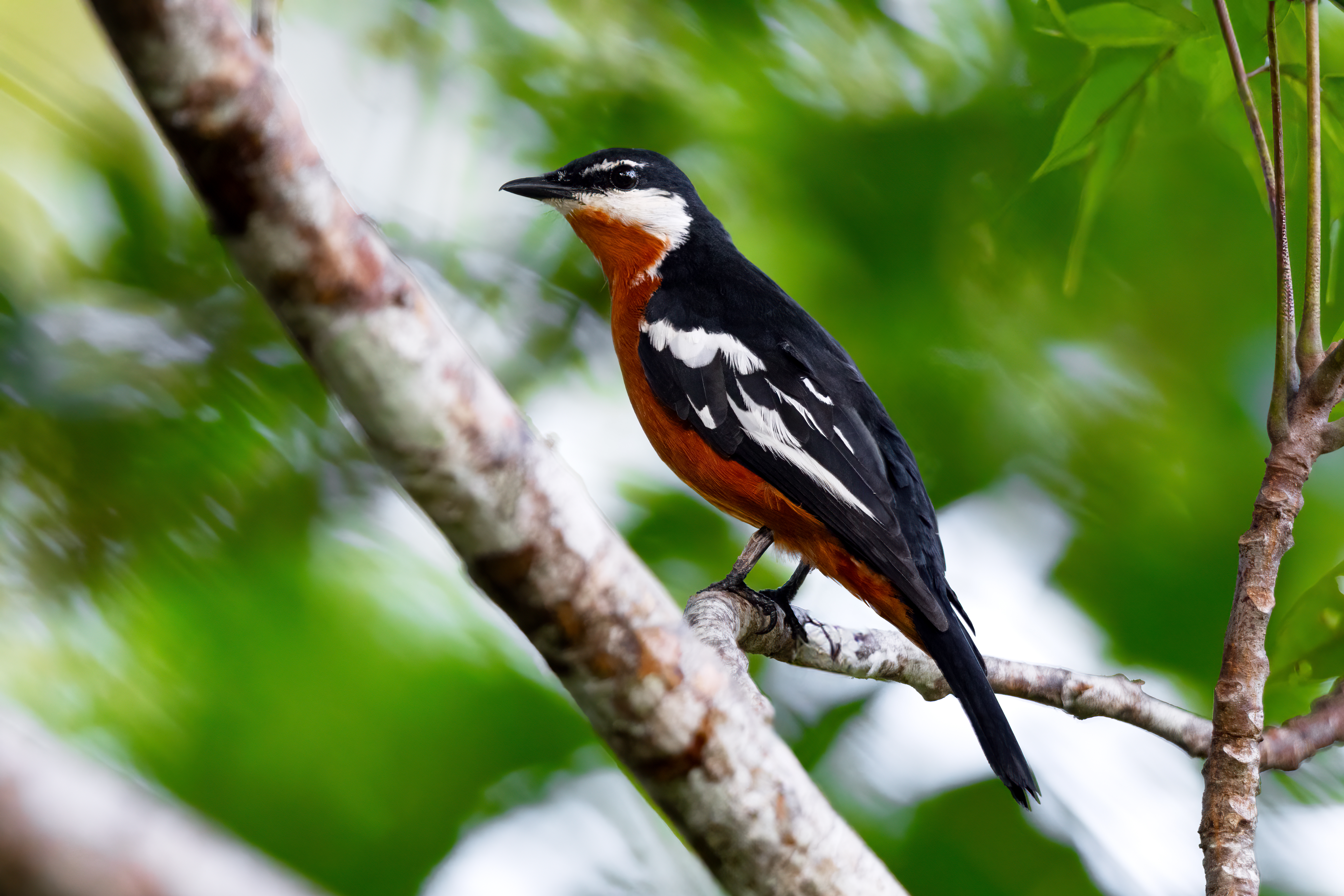

Conservation status
- Least Concern (IUCN 3.1)

Scientific classification
- Kingdom: Animalia
- Phylum: Chordata
- Class: Aves
- Order: Passeriformes
- Family: Campephagidae
- Genus: Lalage
- Species: L. aurea

Binomial name
- Lalage aurea (Temminck, 1825)

= Rufous-bellied triller =

Species of bird

Rufous-bellied Triller feeding

The rufous-bellied triller (Lalage aurea) is a species of bird in the family Campephagidae. It is endemic to North Maluku in Indonesia. Its natural habitats are subtropical or tropical moist lowland forests and subtropical or tropical mangrove forests.
