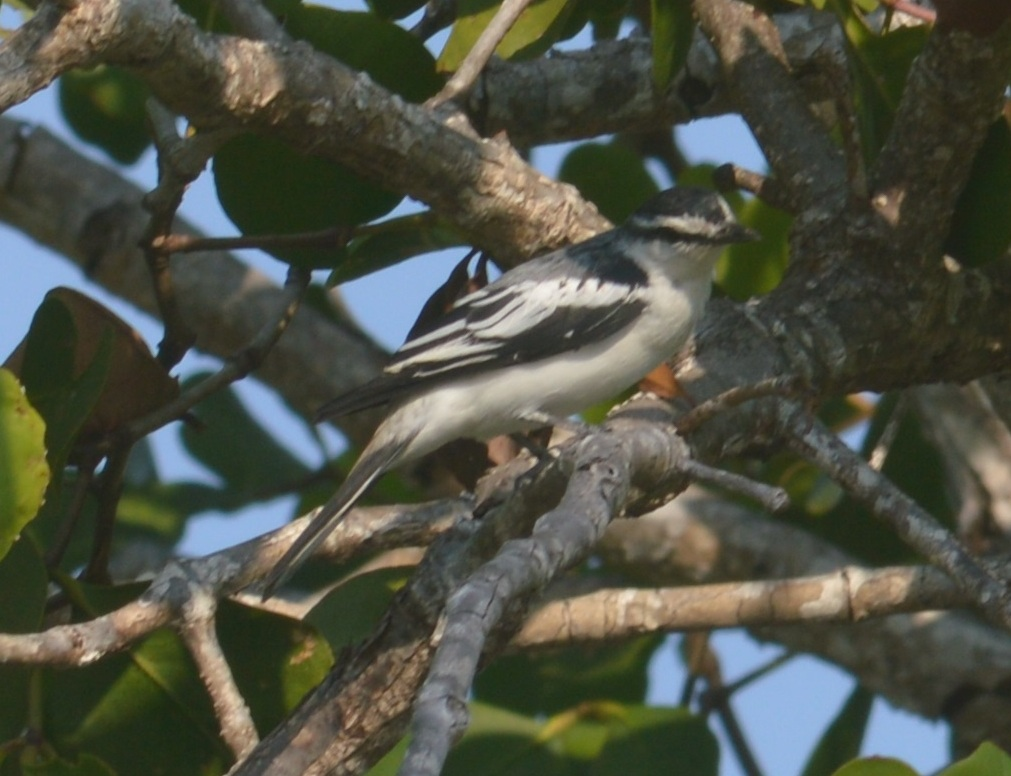

Conservation status
- Least Concern (IUCN 3.1)

Scientific classification
- Kingdom: Animalia
- Phylum: Chordata
- Class: Aves
- Order: Passeriformes
- Family: Campephagidae
- Genus: Lalage
- Species: L. leucopygialis

Binomial name
- Lalage leucopygialis Walden, 1872

= White-rumped triller =

Species of bird

White-rumped Triller, backside

The white-rumped triller (Lalage leucopygialis) is a species of bird in the family Campephagidae. It is endemic to Sulawesi in Indonesia. Its natural habitats are subtropical or tropical moist lowland forest and subtropical or tropical mangrove forest.
