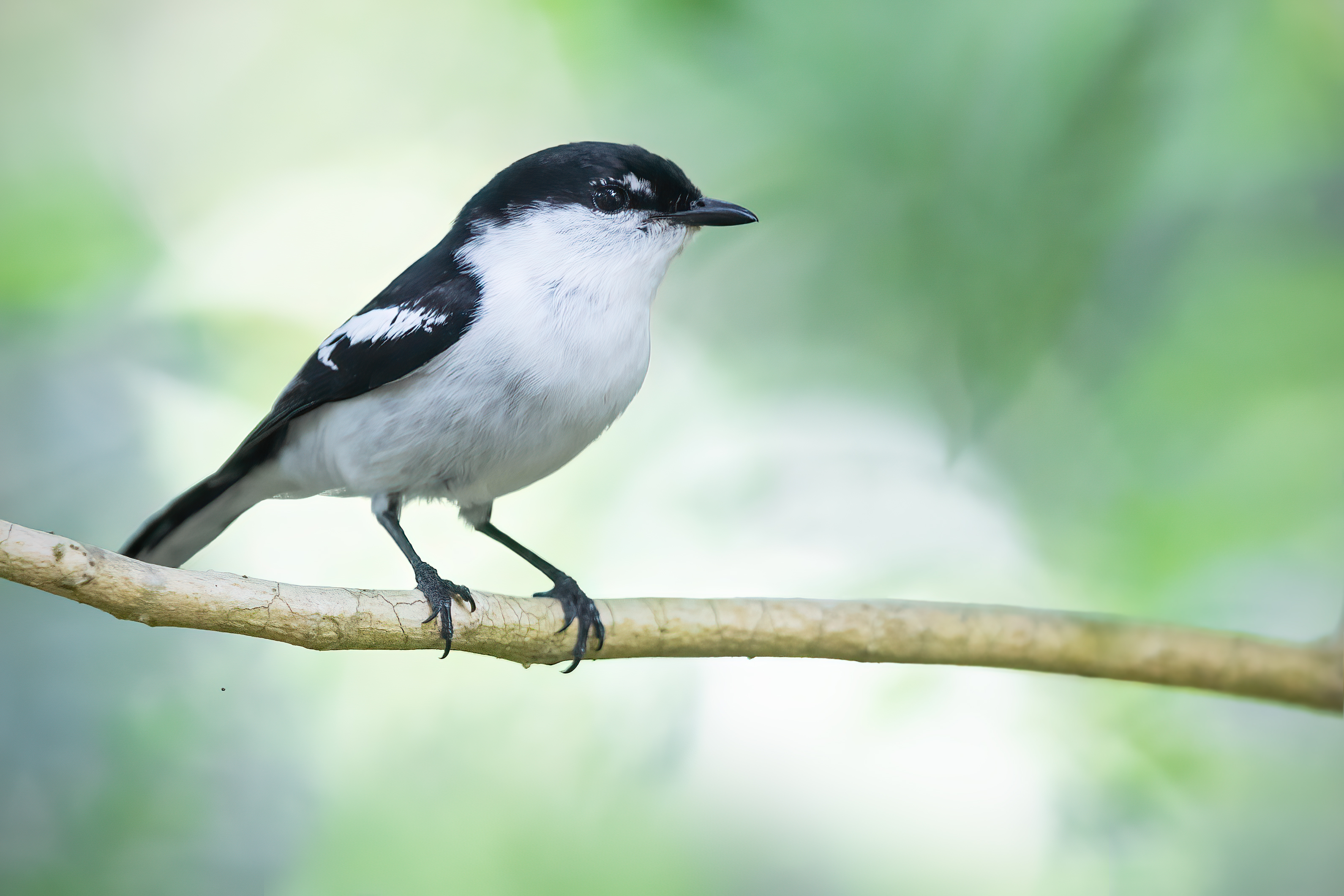

Conservation status
- Least Concern (IUCN 3.1)

Scientific classification
- Kingdom: Animalia
- Phylum: Chordata
- Class: Aves
- Order: Passeriformes
- Family: Campephagidae
- Genus: Lalage
- Species: L. leucopyga

Binomial name
- Lalage leucopyga (Gould, 1838)

= Long-tailed triller =

Species of bird

The long-tailed triller (Lalage leucopyga) is a species of bird in the family Campephagidae. It is found in New Caledonia, Solomon Islands, and Vanuatu. The Norfolk Island subspecies of the long-tailed triller, the Norfolk triller, has become extinct. Its natural habitats are subtropical or tropical moist lowland forests and subtropical or tropical moist montane forests.

== Taxonomy ==
=== Subspecies ===
- †Lalage leucopyga leucopyga: Norfolk Island (extinct)
- Lalage leucopyga montrosieri: New Caledonia
- Lalage leucopyga affinis: the Solomon Islands (Makira and Ugi)
- Lalage leucopyga deficiens: Vanuatu (Torres Island and the Banks Group)
- Lalage leucopyga albiloris: central and northern Vanuatu
- Lalage leucopyga simillima: southern Vanuatu and the Loyalty Islands

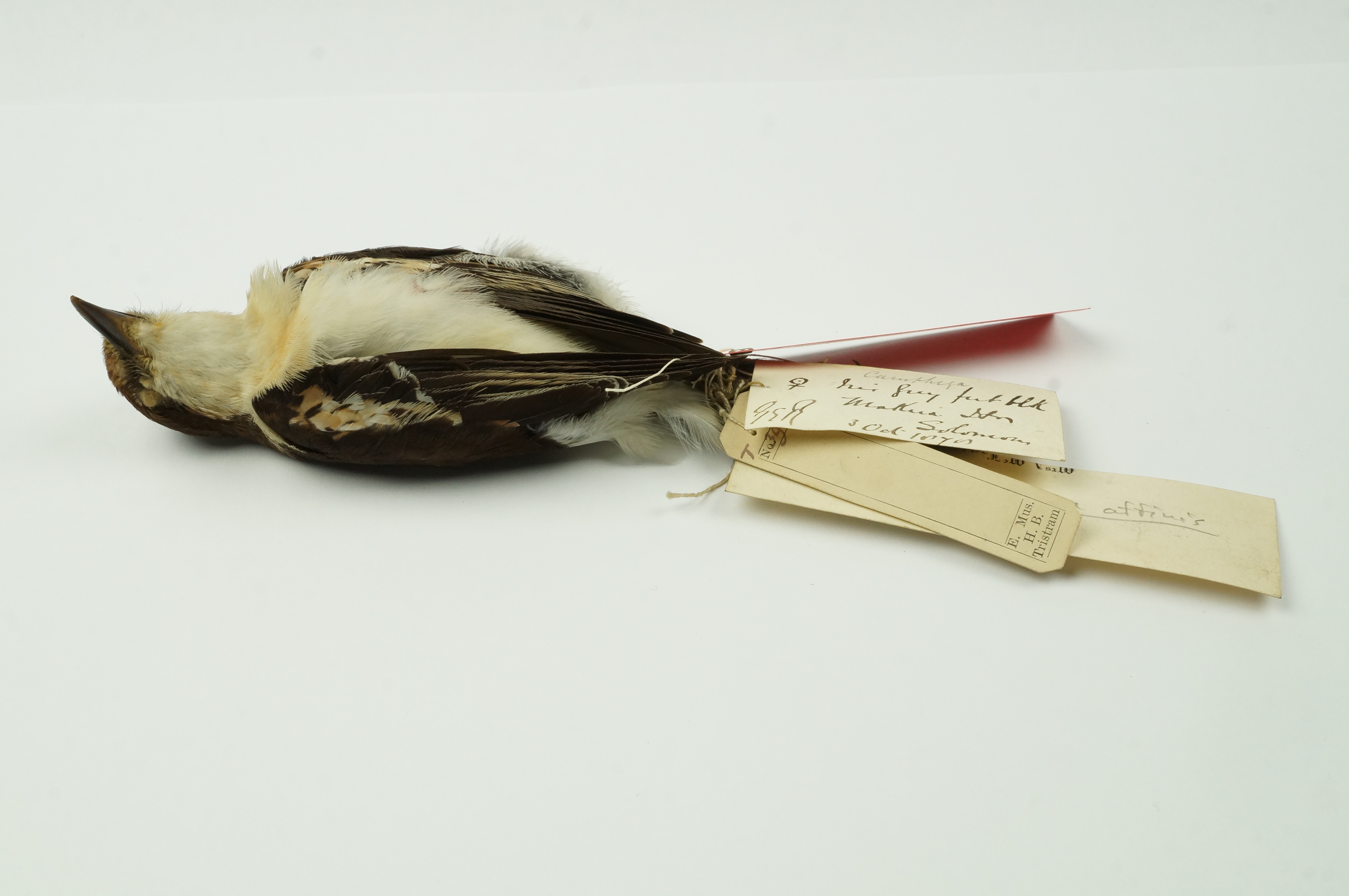
Syntype of Symmorphus (Lalage) affinis Tristram (NML-VZ T3961) held at the World Museum, the National Museums Liverpool

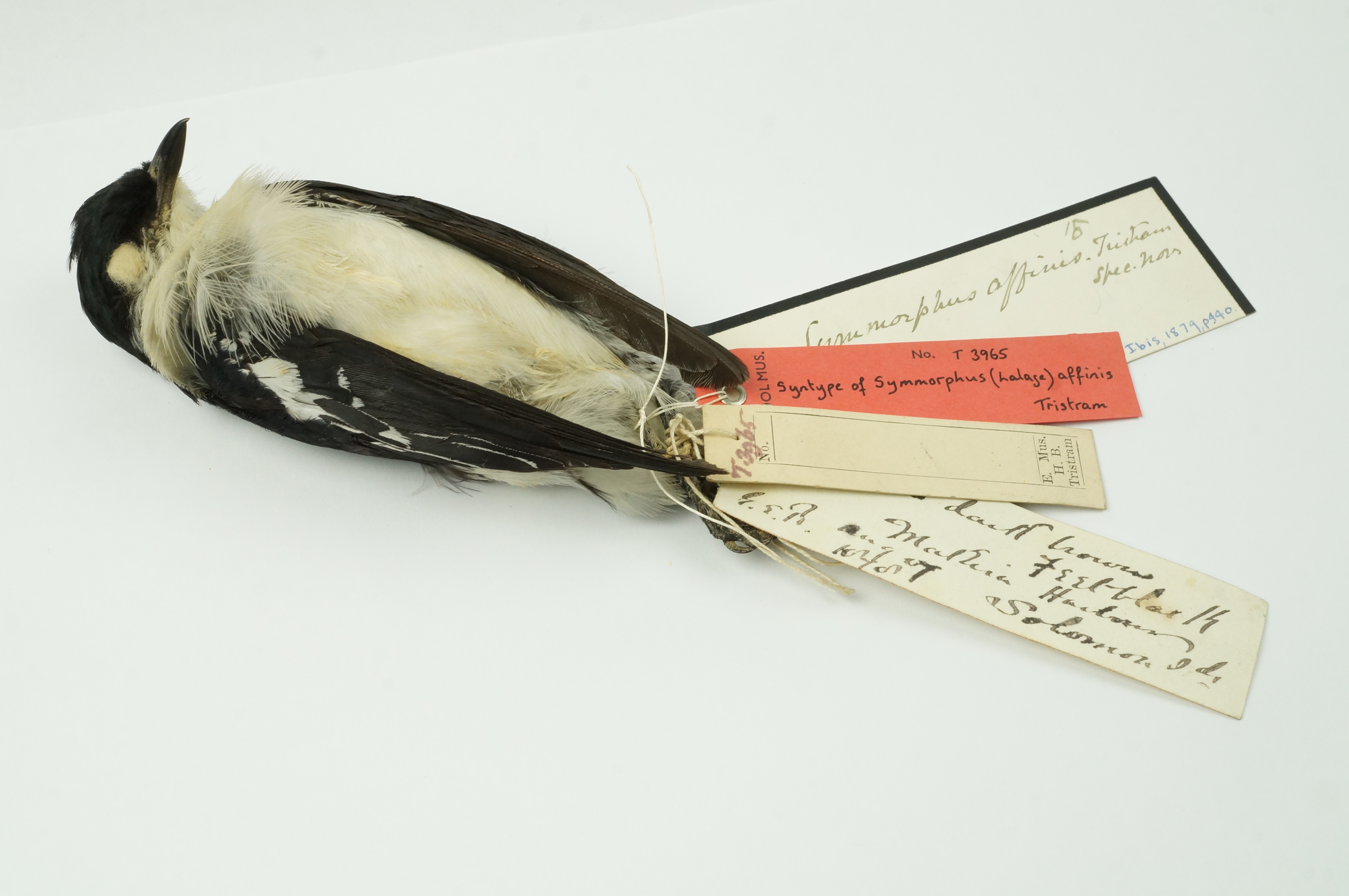
Syntype of Symmorphus (Lalage) affinis Tristram (NML-VZ T3965) held at the World Museum, the National Museums Liverpool

Two syntypes of Symmorphus (Lalage) affinis Tristram (Ibis, 1879, p.440), an adult female and male, are held in the vertebrate zoology collection of the National Museums Liverpool at the World Museum, with accession numbers NML-VZ T3961 and NML-VZ T3965, respectively. The specimens were collected in Makira Harbour, San Cristobel, the Solomon Islands on 3 October 1878 and 27 August 1878, respectively, by G. E. Richards, R.N.. The specimens came to the Liverpool national collection through the purchase of Canon Henry Baker Tristram's collection by the museum in 1896.
