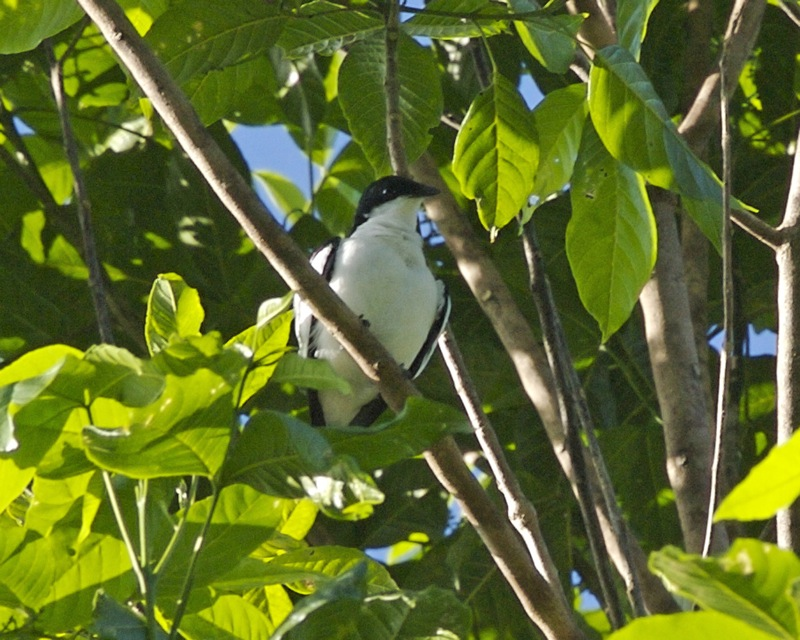

Conservation status
- Least Concern (IUCN 3.1)

Scientific classification
- Kingdom: Animalia
- Phylum: Chordata
- Class: Aves
- Order: Passeriformes
- Family: Campephagidae
- Genus: Lalage
- Species: L. atrovirens

Binomial name
- Lalage atrovirens (Gray, 1862)

= Black-browed triller =

Species of bird

The black-browed triller (Lalage atrovirens) is a species of bird in the family Campephagidae. It is found in northern New Guinea. Its natural habitats are subtropical or tropical moist lowland forests and subtropical or tropical mangrove forests. The Biak triller (L. leucoptera) was formerly considered a subspecies. It is very vocal, and often travels in flocks with other species. Like many bird species of New Guinea, very little is known about it.
