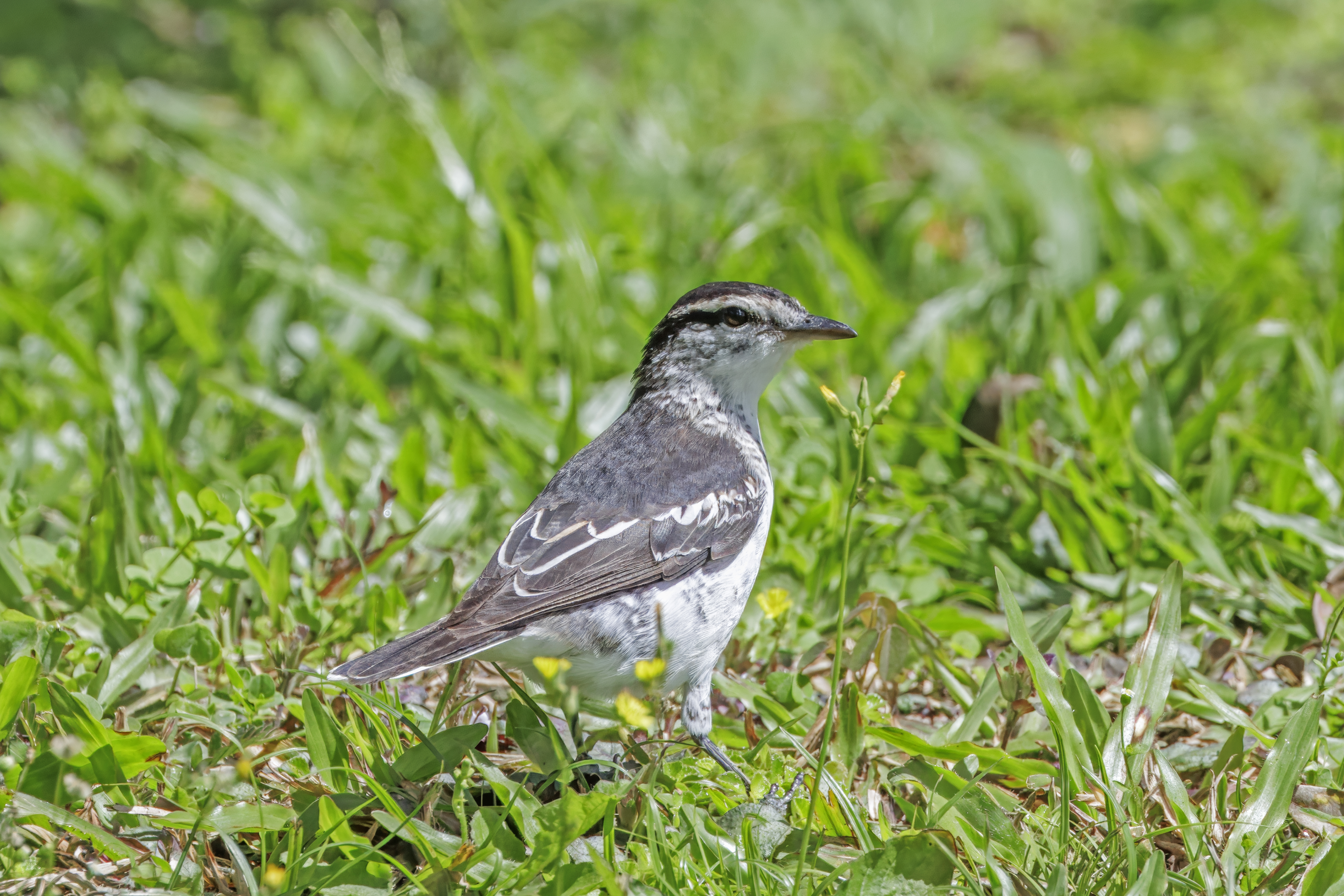
- Lalage maculosa maculosa, Samoa

Conservation status
- Least Concern (IUCN 3.1)

Scientific classification
- Kingdom: Animalia
- Phylum: Chordata
- Class: Aves
- Order: Passeriformes
- Family: Campephagidae
- Genus: Lalage
- Species: L. maculosa

Binomial name
- Lalage maculosa (Peale, 1849)
- Geographic range of the Polynesian triller

= Polynesian triller =

Species of bird

The Polynesian triller (Lalage maculosa) is a passerine bird in the family Campephagidae native to the Southwest Pacific, with 16 subspecies found on different islands across the region.

== Taxonomy ==
The Polynesian triller was first described by Titian Peale in 1849, then under the name Colluricincla maculosa, the species being moved from Colluricincla to Lalage by later authors. Peale did not clearly designate the type, although he did state one of them was collected on Upolu, Samoa, as part of the United States Exploring Expedition of 1838–1842. In 1925 Alexander Wetmore determined the Upulo specimen to have been the one Peale's description of the species was based upon, and thus the type.

16 subspecies of Lelage maculosa are recognized – of which 11 were described in 1941 by Ernst Mayr and Sidney Dillon Ripley from specimens collected by the Whitney South Sea Expedition – each subspecies inhabiting different islands across the Southwest Pacific:

- L. m. maculosa (Peale, 1849) – Found in Samoa, on Upolu and Savaiʻi.
- L. m. whitmeei Sharpe, 1878 – Found on Niue.
- L. m. woodi Wetmore, 1925 – Found in Fiji, on Vanua Levu, Taveuni and Qamea.
- L. m. pumila Neumann, 1927 – Found in Fiji, on Viti Levu.
- L. m. rotumae Neumann, 1927 – Found in Fiji, on Rotuma.
- L. m. futunae Mayr; Ripley, 1941 – Found in Wallis and Futuna, on Futuna and Alofi.
- L. m. keppeli Mayr; Ripley, 1941 – Found in far northern Tonga, on Niuatoputapu and Tafahi.
- L. m. melanopygia Mayr; Ripley, 1941 – Found in the Santa Cruz Islands of Solomon Islands, on Nendö and Utupua.
- L. m. mixta Mayr; Ripley, 1941 – Found in Fiji, on Ovalau and adjacent islands.
- L. m. modesta Mayr; Ripley, 1941 – Found in northern and central Vanuatu, on Emae, Epi, Espiritu Santo, Malakula, Malo, Paama and Tongoa.
- L. m. nesophila Mayr; Ripley, 1941 – Found in Fiji, in the Lau Archipelago.
- L. m. soror Mayr; Ripley, 1941 – Found in Fiji, on Kandavu.
- L. m. tabuensis Mayr; Ripley, 1941 – Found in Tonga, on Haʻapai, Nomuka and Tongatapu.
- L. m. ultimata Mayr; Ripley, 1941 – Found in Vanuatu, on Efate.
- L. m. vanikorensis Mayr; Ripley, 1941 – Found in the Santa Cruz Islands of Solomon Islands, on Vanikoro.
- L. m. vauana Mayr; Ripley, 1941 – Found in Tonga, in the Vavaʻu group.

== Description ==
The Polynesian triller weighs about 30 g (1.1 oz), has a wing length of about 8.5–10 cm (3.3–3.9 in), a tail lengh of about 5.5–7 cm (2.2–2.8 in) and a tarsometatarsus length of about 2–2.5 cm (0.79–0.98 in). The beak is about 0.5 cm (0.20 in) wide and 2 cm (0.79 in) long. The plumage varies geographically; some populations are contrastingly black and white while others have more grey or brown coloration.

== Behaviour and ecology ==
Polynesian trillers begin breeding at just under one-and-a-half years of age. They construct cup-shaped nests in trees, in which one or two eggs are laid. The average generation length is about 2.75–3.5 years. Adults have an annual survival rate of 72%, and the species maximum life span is known to be above 5 years.

They are diurnal and primarily terrestrial. Their diet consists solely of invertebrates. Their natural habitat is subtropical/tropical moist forests, primarily lowland ones and to a lesser extent montane ones. They are also capable of inhabiting urban areas and heavily degraded forest.

== Gallery ==
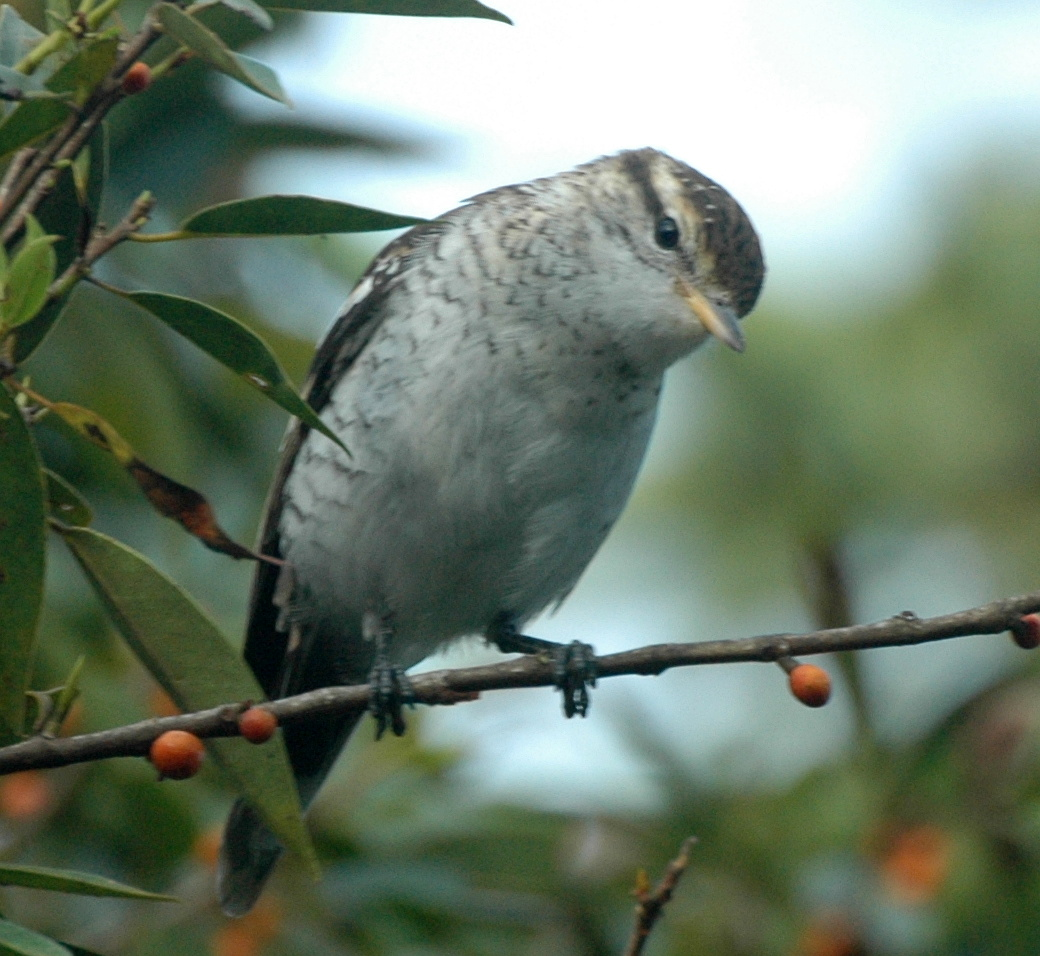
Subspecies L.m. pumila, Abaca, Viti Levu, Fiji Isles

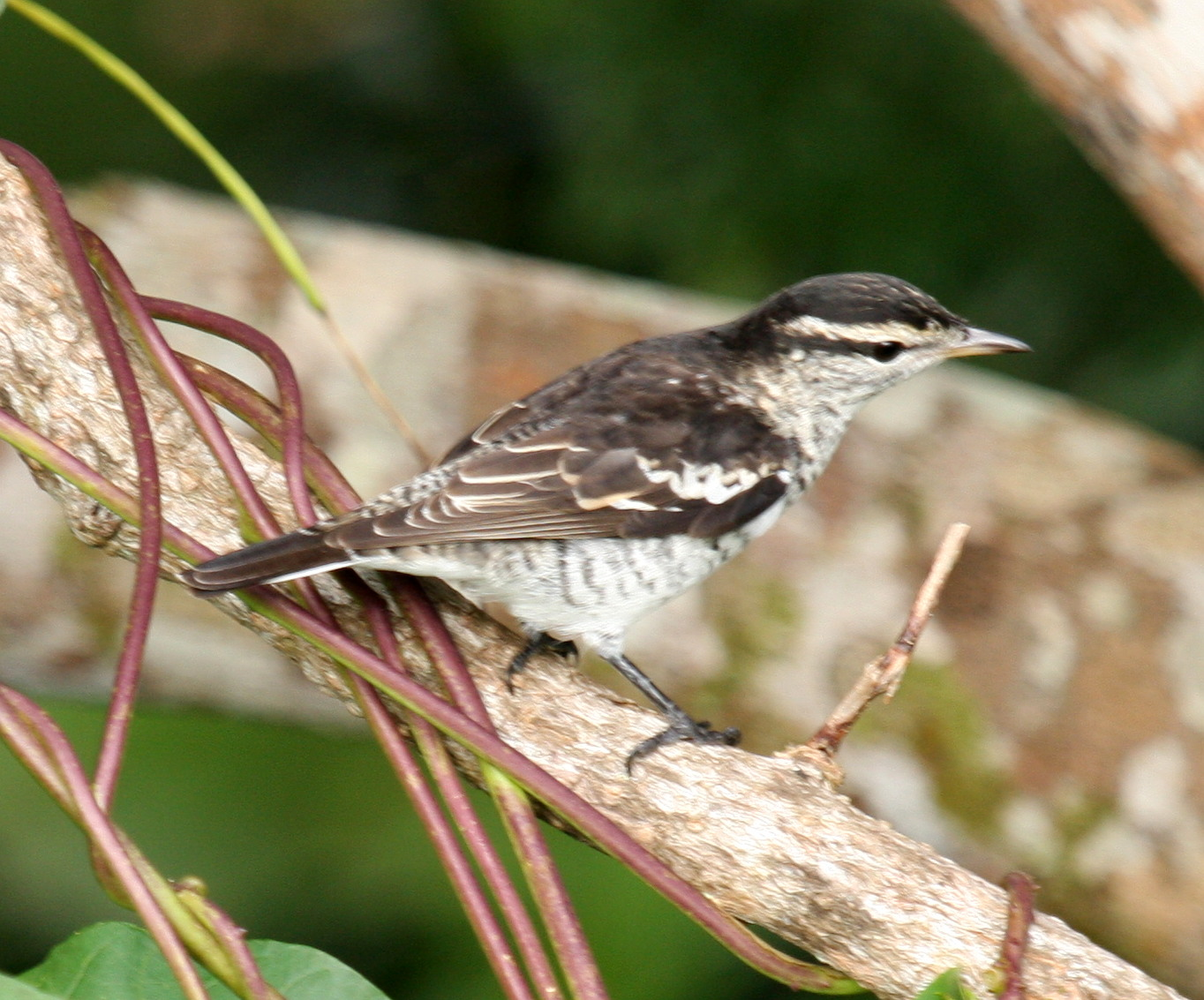
Subspecies L.m. woodi, Savusavu, Vanua Levu, Fiji Isles

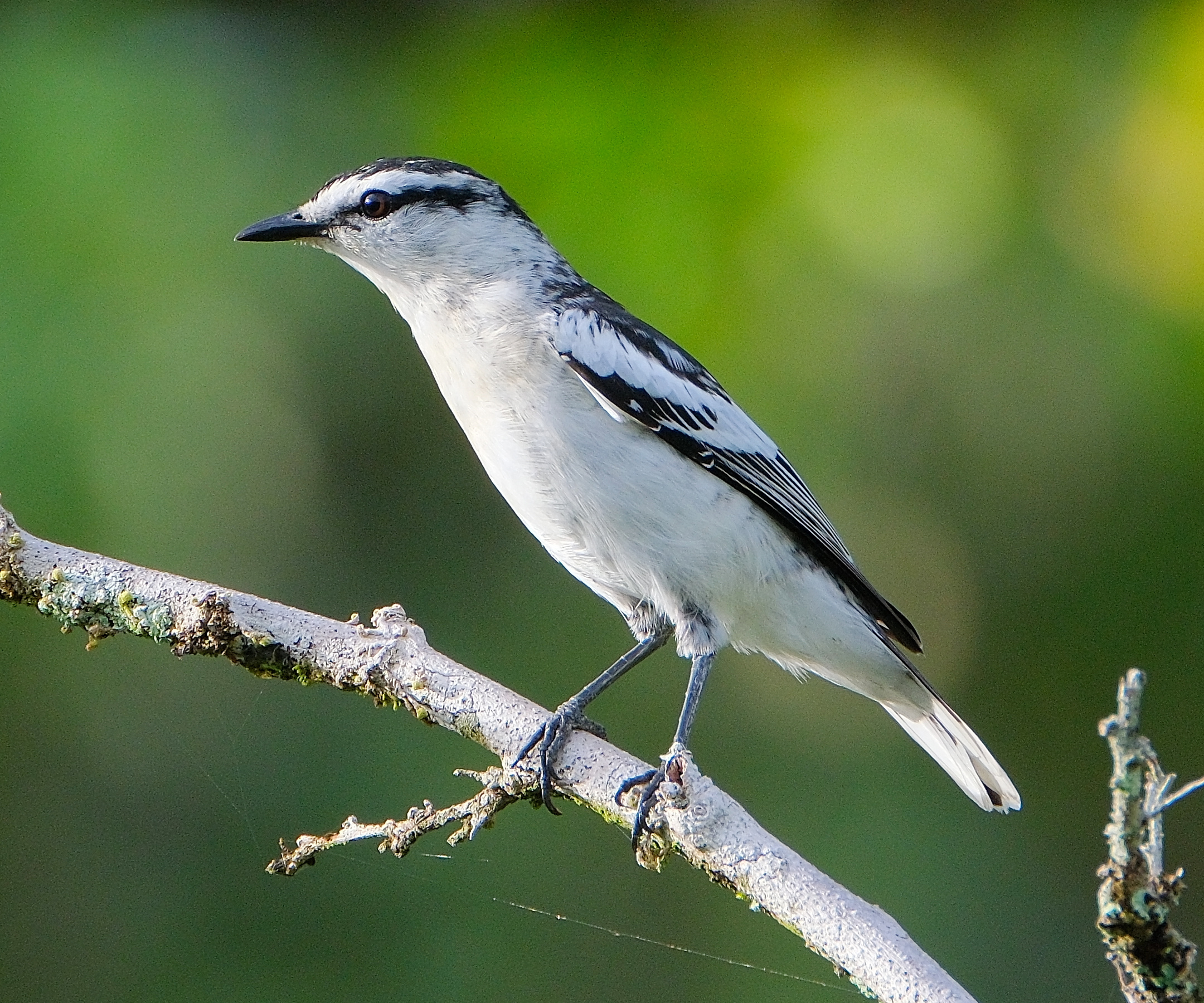
Niue

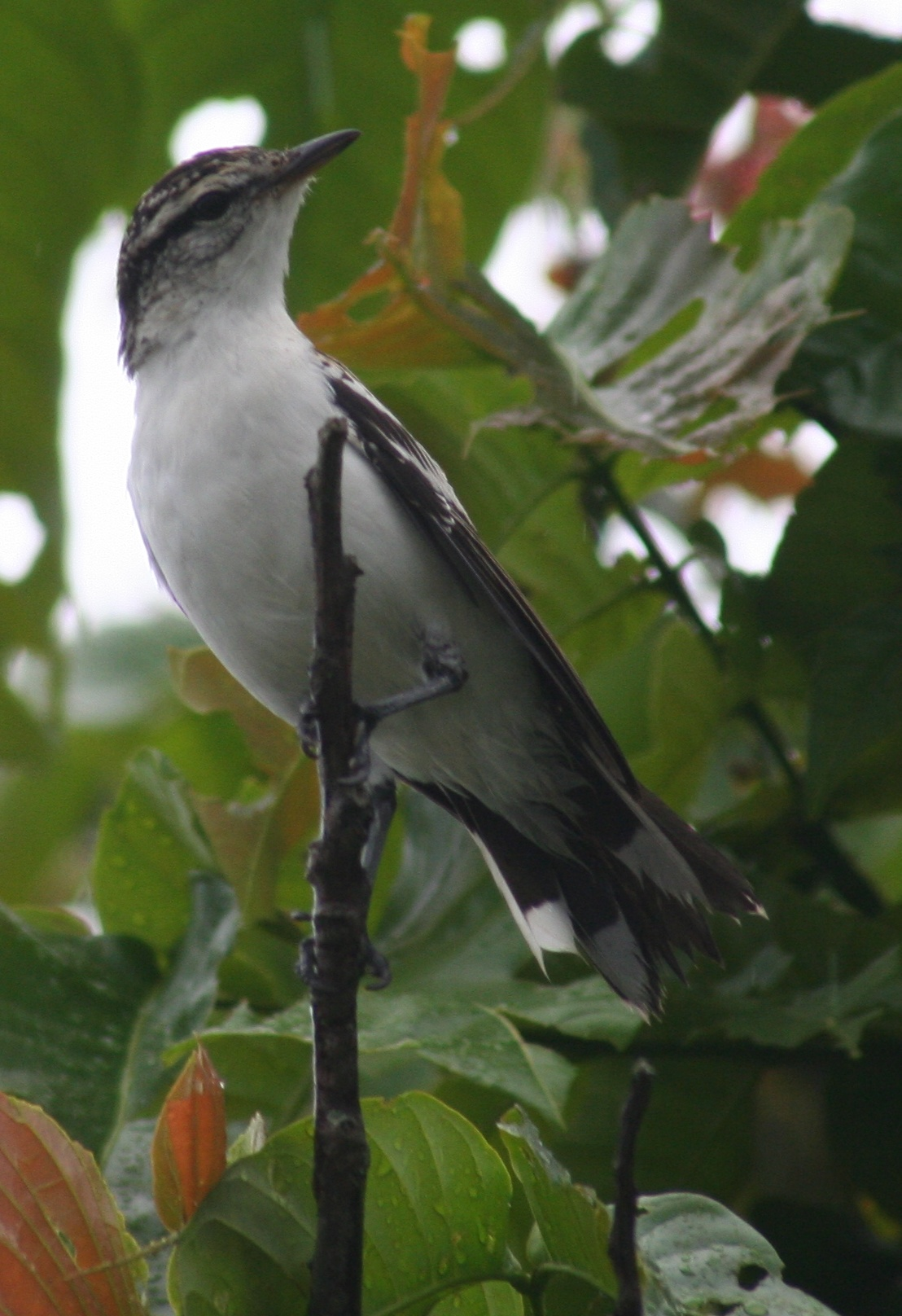
Nuku'alofa, Tonga
