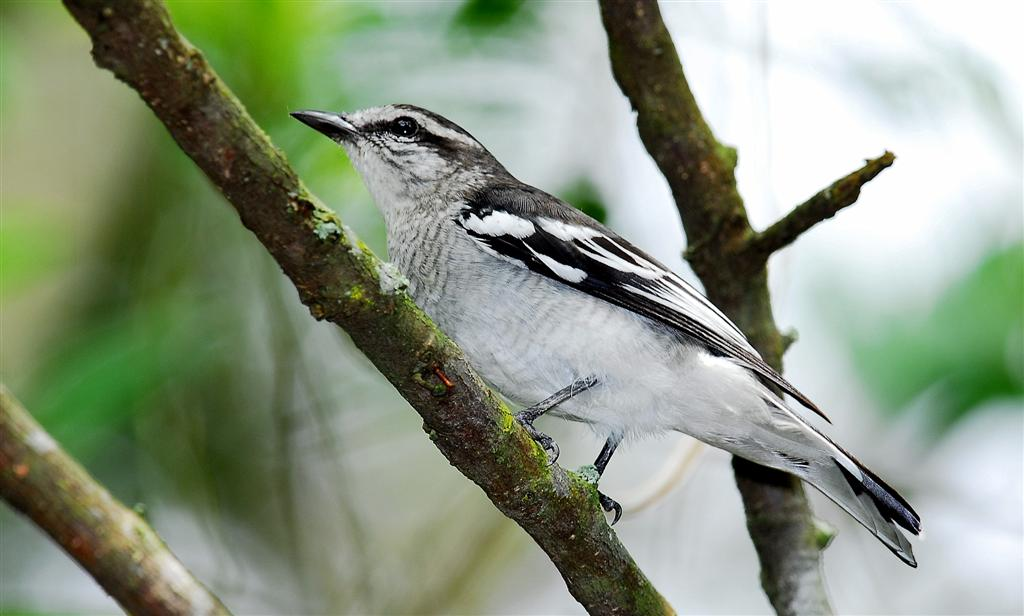

Conservation status
- Least Concern (IUCN 3.1)

Scientific classification
- Kingdom: Animalia
- Phylum: Chordata
- Class: Aves
- Order: Passeriformes
- Family: Campephagidae
- Genus: Lalage
- Species: L. nigra

Binomial name
- Lalage nigra (Pennant, 1781)

= Pied triller =

Species of bird

The pied triller (Lalage nigra) is a species of bird in the cuckooshrike family Campephagidae. It is found in Brunei, India, Indonesia, Malaysia, the Philippines, Singapore, and Thailand.

== Taxonomy ==
In 1760 the French zoologist Mathurin Jacques Brisson included a description and an illustration of the pied triller in the second volume of his Ornithologie based on a specimen that had been collected in the East Indies. He used the French name Le Merle des Indes and the Latin name Merula Indica. Although Brisson coined Latin names, these do not conform to the binomial system and are not recognised by the International Commission on Zoological Nomenclature. In a section of a book by Johann Reinhold Forster published in 1781 the Welsh naturalist Thomas Pennant coined the binomial name Turdus niger for the pied triller and cited Brisson's work. In 1922 the type location was restricted to Singapore by the American zoologist Outram Bangs. The pied triller is now one of 20 species placed in the genus Lalage that was introduced in 1826 by the German zoologist Friedrich Boie.

Three subspecies are recognised:

- L. n. davisoni Kloss, 1926 – Nicobar Islands
- L. n. striga (Horsfield, 1821) – Malay Peninsula, Sumatra, Nias (west of north Sumatra), Bangka and Belitung (east of south Sumatra), Java, Karimunjawa (north of central Java) and Bali
- L. n. nigra (Pennant, 1781) – Borneo and satellites and Philippines

== Gallery ==
Pied triller, Kuala Selangor, Malaysia, Aug 1994

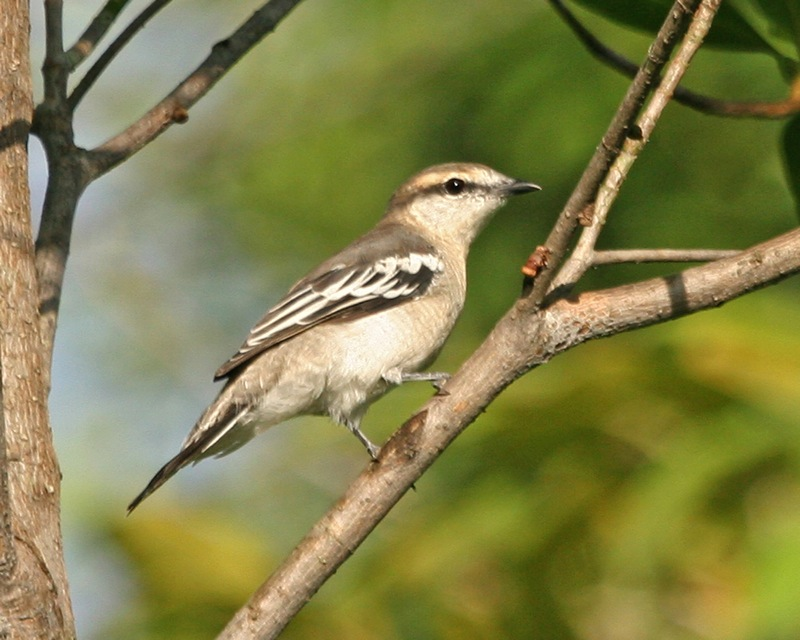
Lalage nigra striga female
