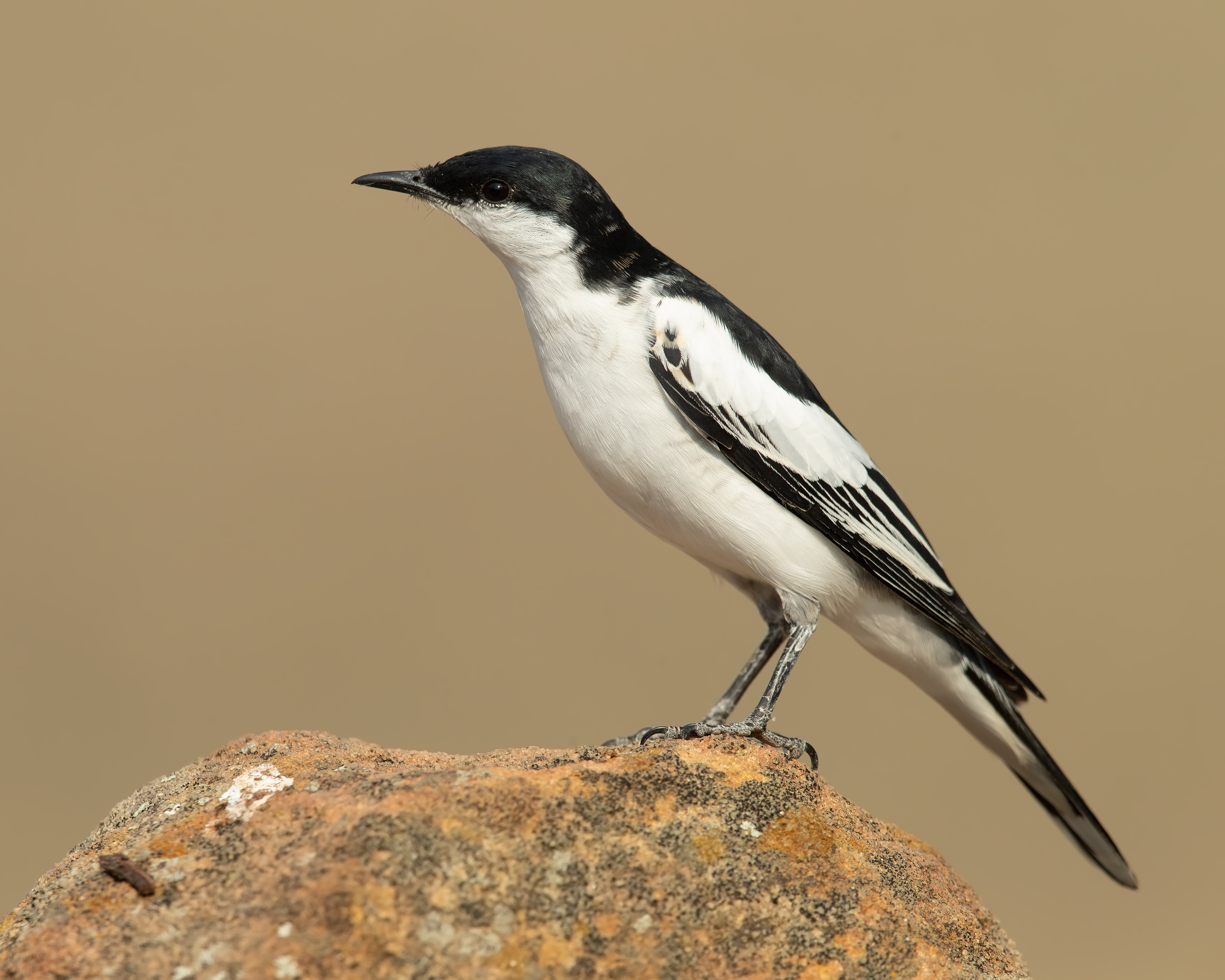
- Male
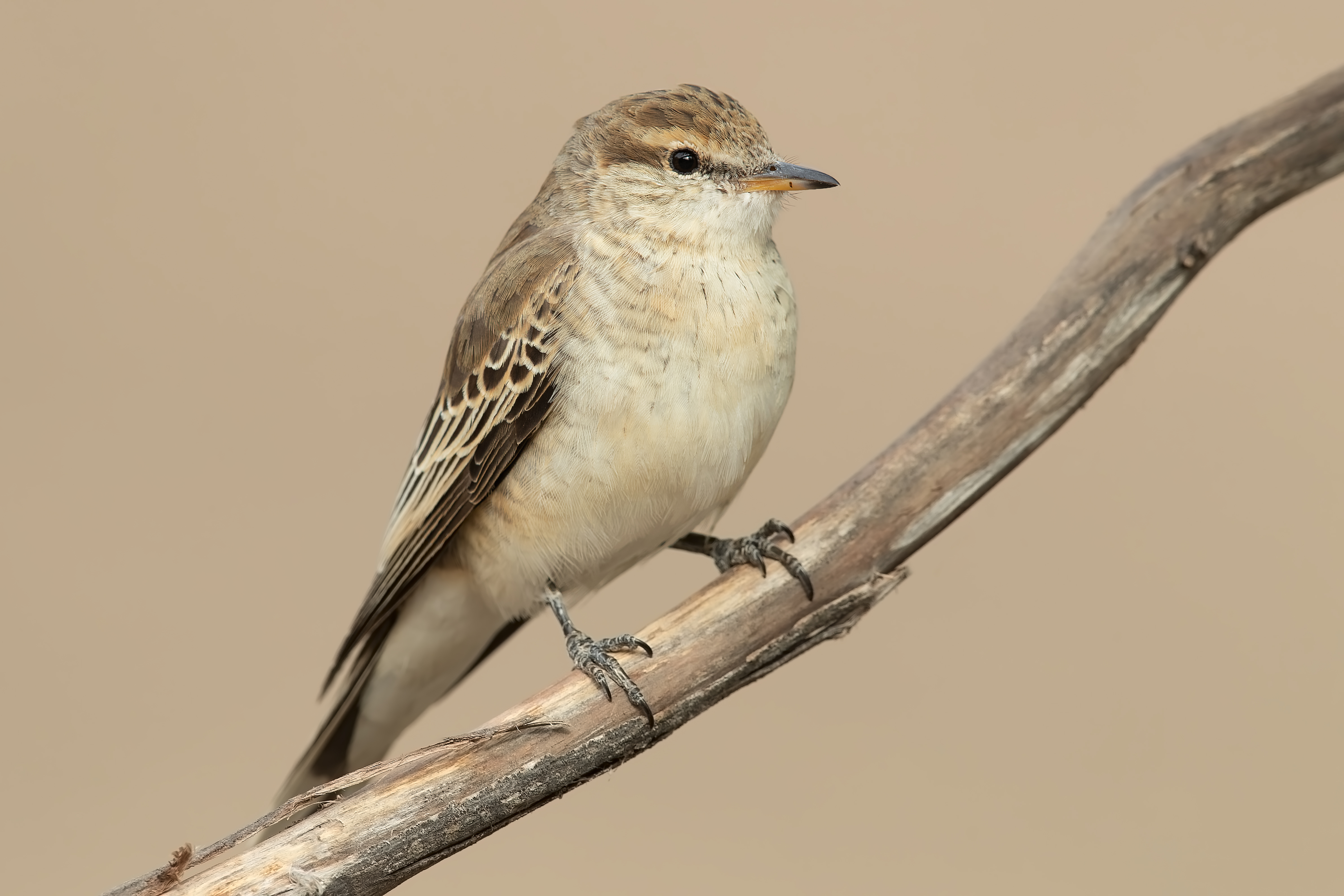
- Female

Conservation status
- Least Concern (IUCN 3.1)

Scientific classification
- Kingdom: Animalia
- Phylum: Chordata
- Class: Aves
- Order: Passeriformes
- Family: Campephagidae
- Genus: Lalage
- Species: L. tricolor

Binomial name
- Lalage tricolor (Swainson, 1825)

= White-winged triller =

Species of bird

The white-winged triller (Lalage tricolor) is one of the smaller members of the cuckooshrike family, Campephagidae. It is found throughout mainland Australia and possibly on the islands to the north, including New Guinea and eastern Indonesia. It is resident or nomadic over the warmer part of its range (inland Australia and points north), and a summer breeding migrant to the cooler southern parts of Australia.

White-winged trillers are fairly common in woodland, and open scrub through most of their range, and close to riverbeds in the central arid zone. The conspicuous male bird—black above and white below in breeding plumage—trills cheerfully through much of the day during the breeding season (mid-spring to early summer), frequently rising on fluttering wings in song flight.

The female is similarly patterned but in dull fawns and white. In the non-breeding season, male birds appear similar to the female, retaining blackish feathers only on the wings and tail.

Typically 16 to 18 cm long, white-winged trillers eat a variety of insects, which are taken on the ground, from foliage, or in the air.

The correct classification of the white-winged triller and its close northern relative, the white-shouldered triller (Lalage sueurii) of eastern Indonesia is uncertain. Some authorities regard them as two races of a single species, in which case the white-winged triller becomes Lalage sueurii tricolor.

The Gamilaraay and Yuwaalaraay people of northern New South Wales use the onomatopoeic name wiigurrun.gurrun to refer to this species.

== Gallery ==
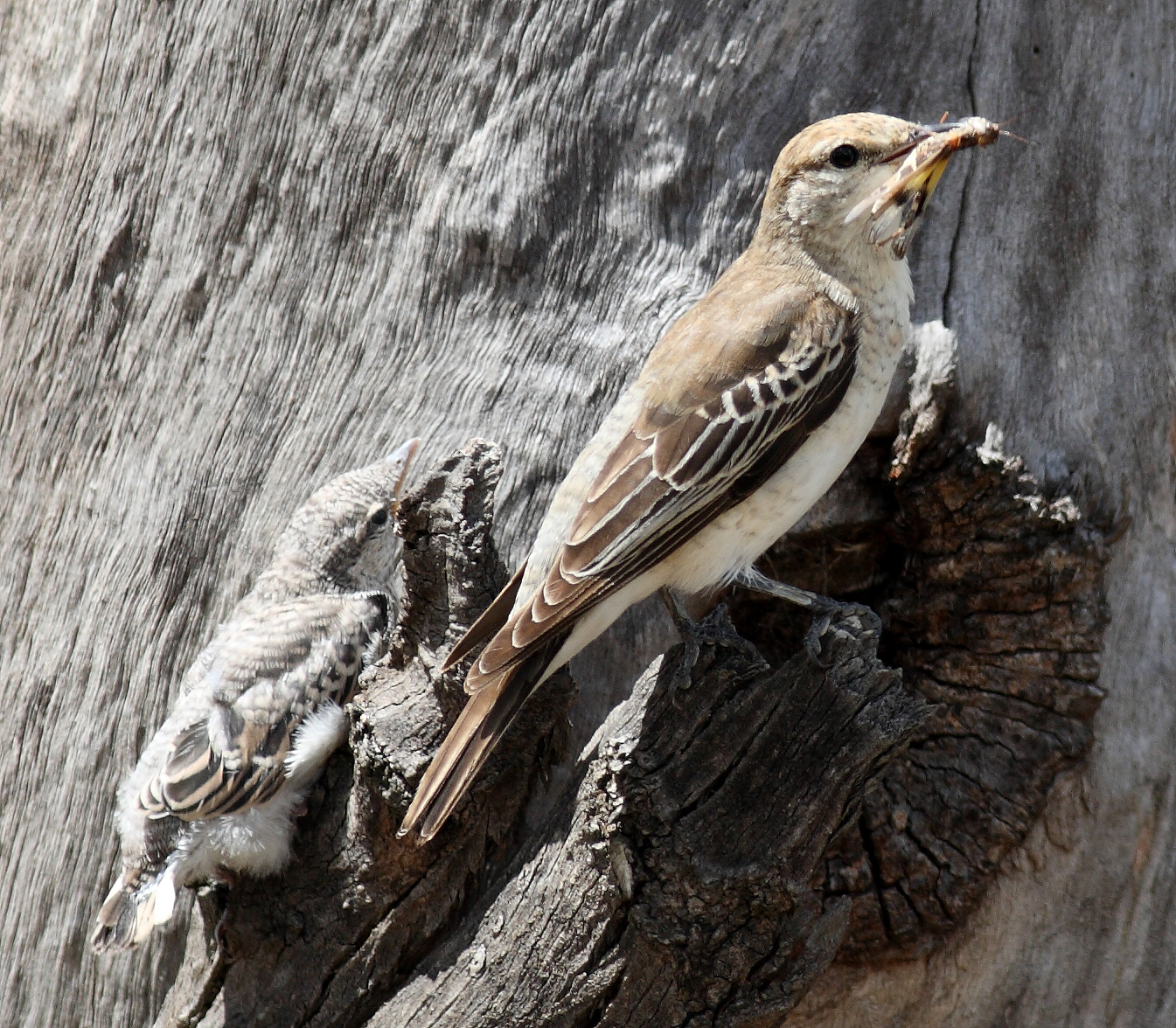
Female white-winged triller and a very well-camouflaged chick
