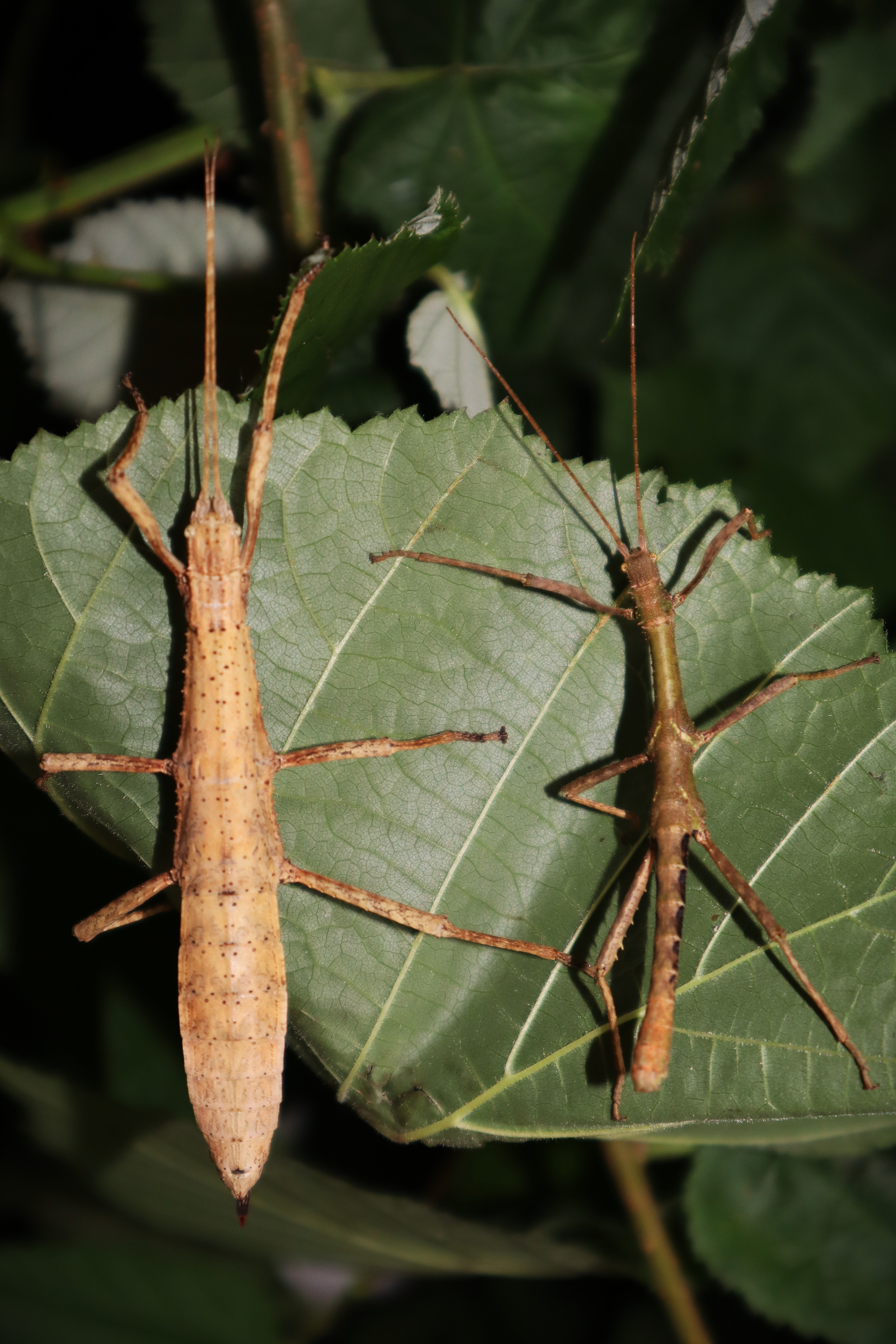
- Eubulides timog, pair

Scientific classification
- Kingdom: Animalia
- Phylum: Arthropoda
- Clade: Pancrustacea
- Class: Insecta
- Order: Phasmatodea
- Family: Heteropterygidae
- Subfamily: Obriminae
- Tribe: Obrimini
- Genus: Eubulides
- Species: E. timog

Binomial name
- Eubulides timog Hennemann, 2023

= Eubulides timog =

Species of stick insect

Eubulides timog is a stick insect species from the family of the Heteropterygidae. Although only described in 2023, this species, native to the south and east of the Philippine island Luzón, has been kept and bred in the terrariums of enthusiasts since 2009.

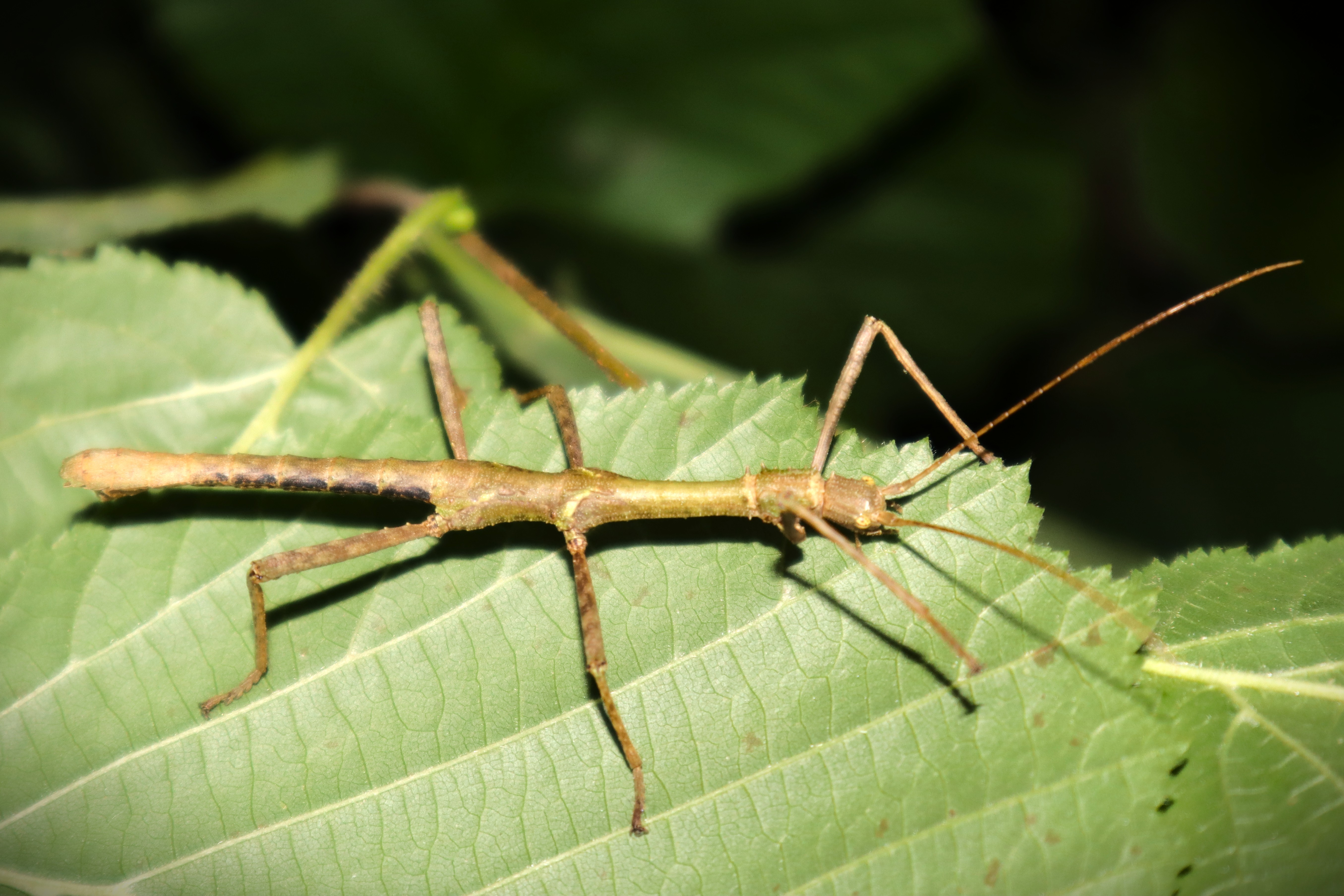
Male

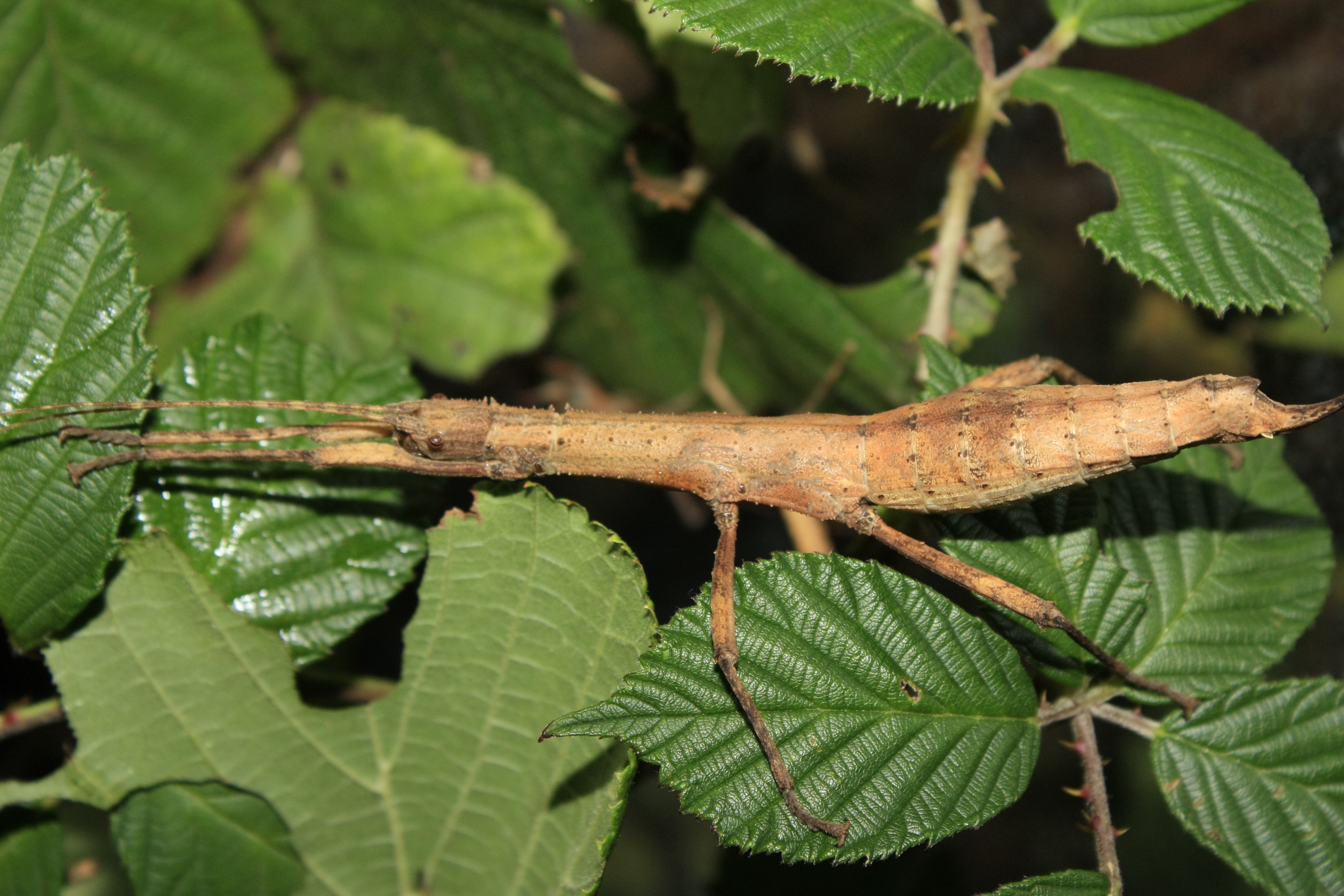
Female

== Discovery and occurrence ==
The first specimens of this species were collected in August 1995 by Oliver Zompro at an altitude of about 600 metres (2,000 ft) on the Mount Banahaw in the Philippine province of Quezon. Zompro assigned the two males and one female he collected and described to Eubulides igorrote. Other specimens initially assigned to Eubulides alutaceus were found by Joachim Bresseel and Thierry Heitzmann in the Quezon National Park in 2009. In April 2010, Isamael Lumawig found specimens in the Sierra Madre Mountains. Bresseel, Heitzmann, Tim Bollens and Rob Krijns found further specimens in Marinfata on the road to Infanta in April of the same year.

Eubulides timog is widespread in the south and east of Luzon and is considered common. Evidence has been found in the provinces of Quezon, Quirino, Albay and Sorsogon. The species has also been found in the south of the island of Leyte.

== Description ==
The females of this medium-sized Eubulides species reach a length of 64 to 76 millimetres (2.5 to 3.0 in). At the end of the abdomen is the beak-shaped secondary ovipositor typical of species of the Obriminae, as in all species of the genus, is characteristically curved upwards in a sickle shape. The coloration and pattern of the females are very variable. In addition to uniformly light to dark brown animals, there are occasionally those with brown, light beige to white patterns, as well as those with almost black and white coloration. Animals with a thin, dark longitudinal stripe extending from the head to the end of the abdomen also occur.

Males are more slender and remain significantly smaller, with a length of 49 to 54 millimetres (1.9 to 2.1 in). They are usually uniformly light or medium brown in color and only rarely show brown or beige patterns in the area of the lateral meso- and metanotum.

In their habit the species is very similar to the slightly larger Eubulides lumawigi native to northern Luzon. E. timog can be distinguished from this by the shape of the ventral anal segment, which in the males of E. lumawigi is clearly two-lobed at the posterior edge, while in those of E. timog it is hexagonal and shows only a slight bulge at the posterior edge. In the females of E. lumawigi the ovipositor is elongated and its dorsally located epiproct is twice as long as the anal segment, which is rounded at the posterior edge. In those of E. timog the posterior edge of the anal segment is indented in the middle and the epiproct is no longer than 1.8 times the length of the anal segment.

In contrast to the much smaller Eubulides igorrote, E. timog, like all other representatives of the genus, lacks spines on the lateral edge of the pronotum and the four large spines on the anterior edge of the mesonotum.

The more slender E. timog can be distinguished from the almost equally large Eubulides alutaceus by its body shape. In E. alutaceus, the rear parts of the meso- and metathorax as well as the meso- and metafemurs are significantly enlarged. This feature otherwise only occurs in the significantly larger Eubulides taylori from Polillo Island.

== Lifestyle and reproduction ==
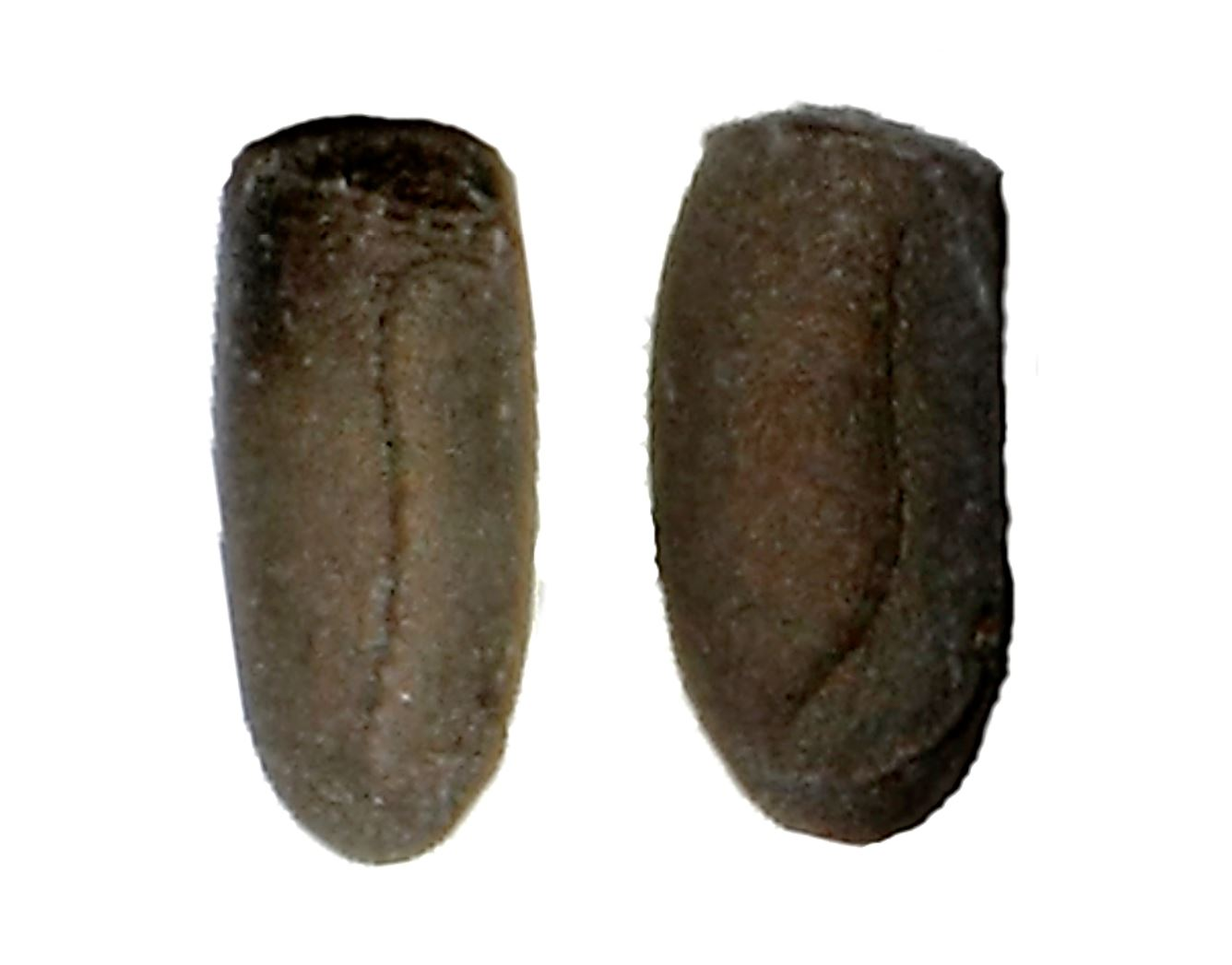
Eggs in different views

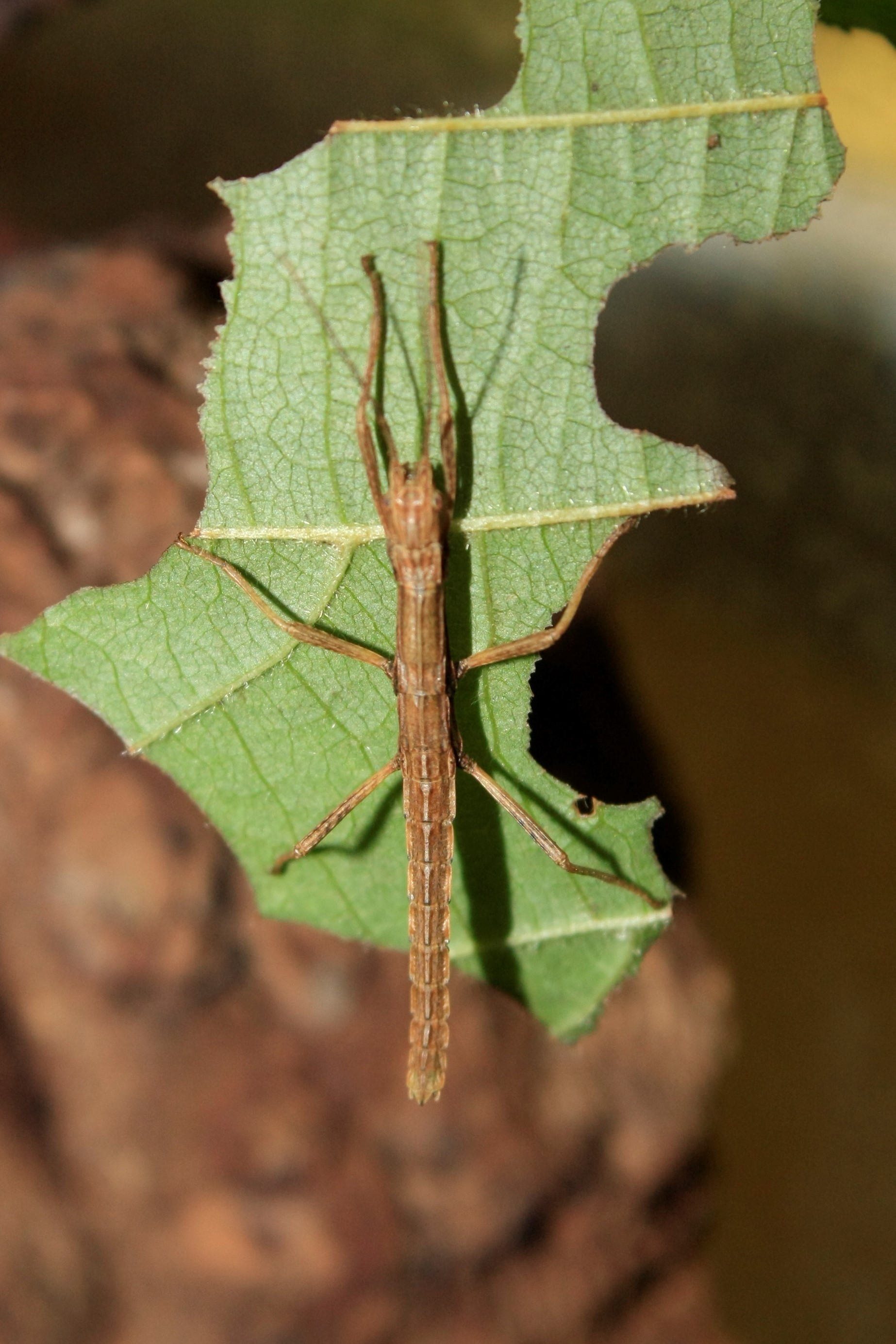
Freshly hatched nymph

In the wild, the species has been found in shady to semi-shady biotopes on various Araceae. The projectile-shaped eggs, which are laid in the soil using the curved ovipositor, are typical for the genus. They are about 5.3 millimetres (0.21 in) long, 3.4 to 3.5 millimetres (0.13 to 0.14 in) 1.9 millimetres (0.075 in) wide and 2.2 millimetres (0.087 in) high and brown. The lid (operculum) is somewhat darker and sits on the egg at an angle sloping towards the ventral side, creating an opercular angle of about 15 degrees. The micropylar plate is broad, almost rectangular in the upper part and inverted V-shaped at the lower pole in the direction of the micropyle and 3.8 millimetres (0.15 in) long. After three to four months, the nymphs hatch, which are about 10 millimetres (0.39 in) long and uniformly brown in color when they hatch.

== Taxonomy ==
Sarah Bank et al. included five samples of Eubulides representatives in their study published in 2021 based on genetic analysis to clarify the phylogeny of the Heteropterygidae. While three samples turned out to be conspecific and belonged to Eubulides igorrote, two others did not fit this species. One of them came from a breeding stock and was described in 2023 by Frank H. Hennemann as Eubulides timog alongside three other species of the genus. The chosen specific name "timog" means "south" or "southern" in Filipino language and refers to the distribution area of the species, which is limited to southern Luzon.

Of the specimens collected on April 10, 2011, in Marinfanta, one female is deposited as holotype and another female and two males as paratypes in the Museum of Natural Sciences in Brussels. A male collected in April 2010 in the Sierra Madre Mountains and two females from Mt. Palakong, a male from Atimonan and a female from Mount Banahaw, which were collected there from April 11 to 14, 2011, are also deposited there as paratypes. Hennemann's specimen collection contains a further 30 paratypes, including 2 juvenile animals, as well as 50 eggs.

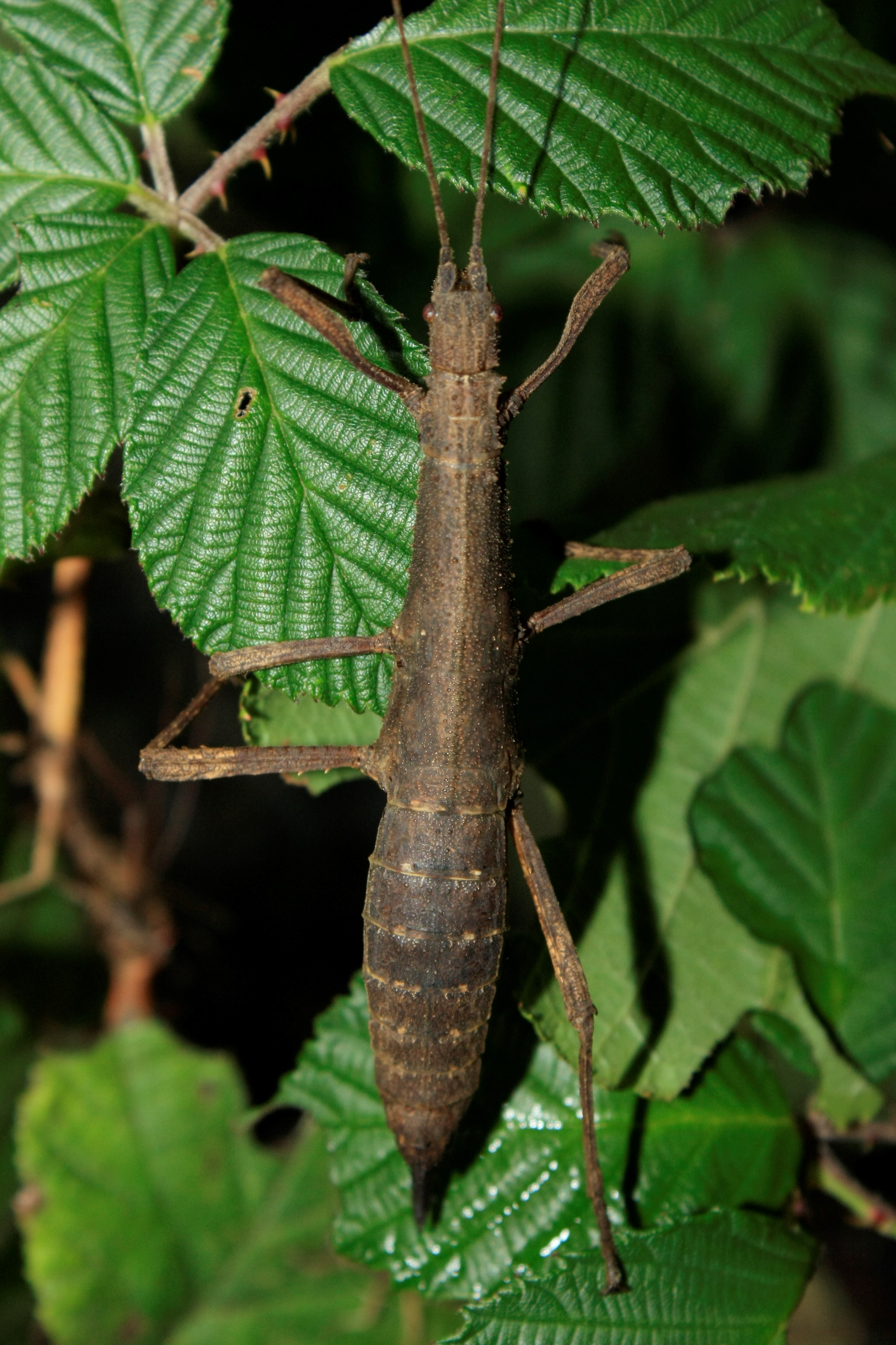
Dark colored female

== In terraristics ==
The first specimens reached Europe were all referred to as Eubulides igorrote. The adult specimens that Bresseel brought back to Belgium from a collecting trip in 2009 accepted various food plants, such as Hosta. Heitzmann sent eggs to Krijns to the Netherlands. The nymphs that hatched from these proved to be finicky and only accepted Spathiphyllum as food plant. In the end, only two female animals remained. Krijns supplemented these with two males, also the only remaining ones, which he received from Oskar V. Conle. Krijns brought more animals back from his trip to the Philippines in 2010 and bred them on Araceae such as Spathiphyllum, Dieffenbachia and Philodendron. The Belgians Kristien Rabaey and Rob Simoens were also able to breed the species successfully from Heitzmann's eggs. As early as 2012, the species was no longer bred as a sexual strain. The parthenogenetic stock that has been available since then goes back to eggs that Heitzmann sent to Holger Dräger in Germany. From these, only one female hatched, which became an adult. The resulting breeding stock must correctly be called Eubulides timog 'Quezon'.

The species is listed by the Phasmid Study Group under the PSG number 311, initially referred to as Eubulides igorrote and from 2019 to 2024 as Eubulides alutaceus.

The current breeding stock is easy to keep and to breed. Temperatures of 20 to 22 °C (68 to 72 °F) are sufficient for breeding. In addition to leaves from Araceae such as Epipremnum, bramble and other Rosaceae as well as hazel, oaks and salal are suitable as food plants. A slightly moist layer of soil or sand should cover the ground for laying eggs.
