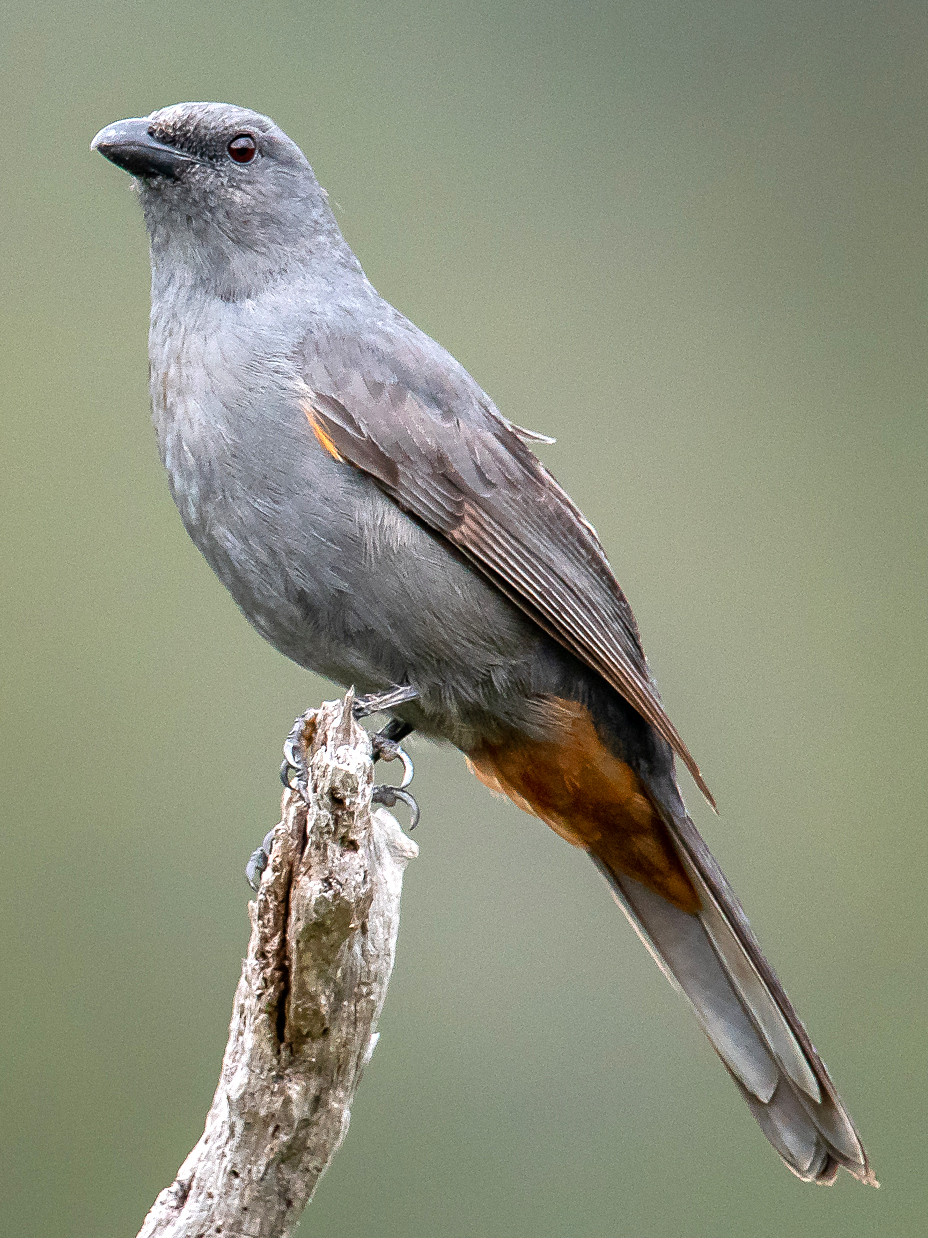

Conservation status
- Near Threatened (IUCN 3.1)

Scientific classification
- Kingdom: Animalia
- Phylum: Chordata
- Class: Aves
- Order: Passeriformes
- Family: Campephagidae
- Genus: Edolisoma
- Species: E. anale

Binomial name
- Edolisoma anale (Verreaux, J & Des Murs, 1860)
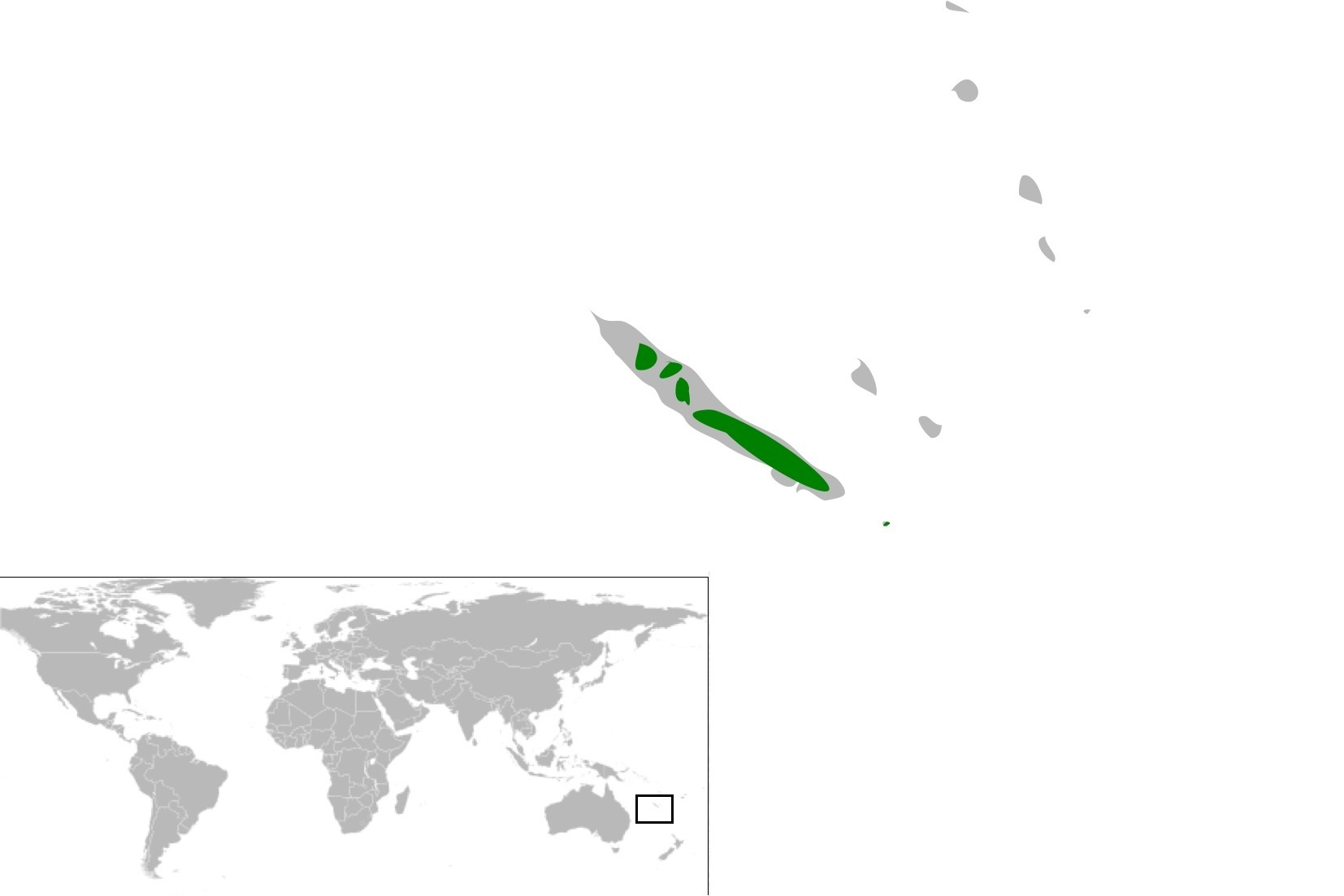

Synonyms
- Coracina analis Analisoma analis

= New Caledonian cuckooshrike =

Species of bird

The New Caledonian cuckooshrike or New Caledonian cicadabird (Edolisoma anale) is a species of bird in the family Campephagidae. It is endemic to New Caledonia. Some taxonomists place this species in the genus Analisoma.

Its natural habitats are subtropical or tropical moist lowland forest and subtropical or tropical moist montane forest.

The New Caledonian cuckooshrike is one of two cuckooshrikes regular to New Caledonia, the other being the South Melanesian Cuckooshrike. The latter has a bright yellow eye, is noticeably more blue-tinted, and lacks the reddish-brown undertail coverts of its counterpart.

== Etymology ==
The specific epithet, anale / analis, comes from the Latin analis meaning "relating to the undertail-coverts" or "of the vent", further derived from anus, ani, meaning "anus".

== Habitat and ecology ==
The New Caledonian cuckooshrike has an extent of occurrence of 16,400 km^{2} (4,100,000 acres) at an elevation of 0–1,500 m (0–4,921 ft) above sea level. It is endemic to New Caledonia, living mainly in subtropical to tropical moist forests, though moist montane forests are also suitable. They are non-migratory.

The mature population size was estimated to be 8,000–15,000 individuals in 2006. Due to mining and fire threats on Grande Terre, the main habitat, it is suspected that the population is decreasing at an unknown rate.

Their trophic level is that of a carnivore, and their trophic niche is that of an invertivore (invertebrate-eater).

They reach reproductive age at 1.4 years and live to 3.7 years on average, though some specimens have lived to 10.78 years old.

== Description ==
The dominant colors of the New Caledonian cuckooshrike are grey, black, and white, with small amounts of brown, red, beige, and orange. Overall, they are mostly grey, however, they have reddish-brown undertail coverts.

They are 24–28 cm (9.4–11.0 in) long from beak-tip to tail-tip. They weigh 97 g (3.4 oz). Their wingspan is 28.16 cm (11.09 in). The length of their legs is 3.08 cm (1.21 in). The length of their beak is 1.53 cm (0.60 in), with width and height being 0.86 cm (0.34 in) and 1.13 cm (0.44 in), respectively.
