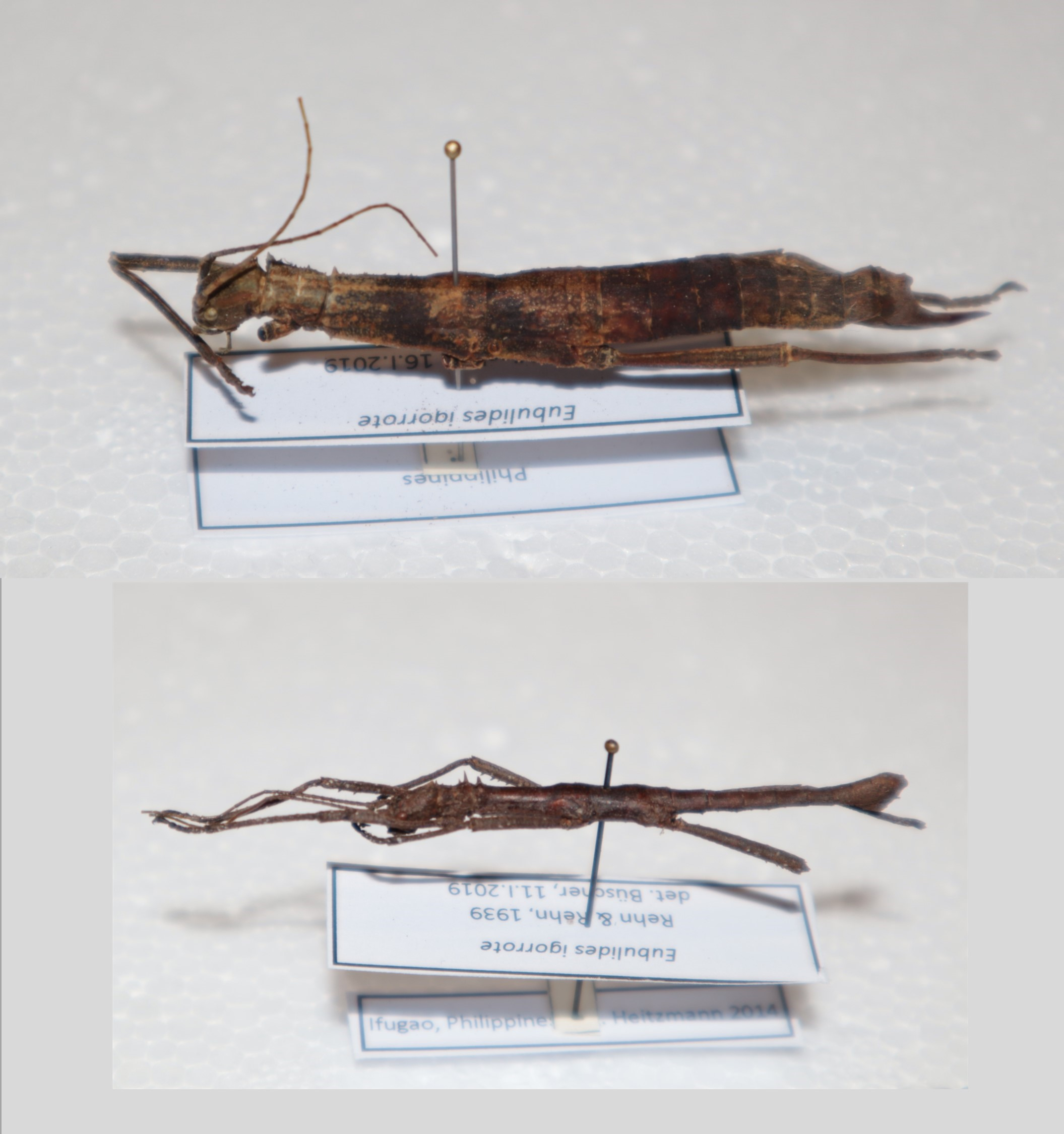
- Prepared specimens of Eubulides igorrote, above female, below male

Scientific classification
- Kingdom: Animalia
- Phylum: Arthropoda
- Clade: Pancrustacea
- Class: Insecta
- Order: Phasmatodea
- Family: Heteropterygidae
- Genus: Eubulides
- Species: E. igorrote

Binomial name
- Eubulides igorrote Rehn, J. A. G. & Rehn, J.W.H., 1939

= Eubulides igorrote =

Species of stick insect

Eubulides igorrote is a stick insect species from the family of the Heteropterygidae native to the Philippine island of Luzon.

== Description ==
In terms of habit, the animals resemble all other representatives of the genus Eubulides. With a length of 51 to 53 millimetres (2.0 to 2.1 in) or up to 58 millimetres (2.3 in) in females and 35.5 to 39.7 millimetres (1.40 to 1.56 in) or up to 44 millimetres (1.7 in) in males, Eubulides igorrote is the smallest species of the genus. It differs from the other Eubulides species not only in its small size, but also in the spiny lateral edges of the pronotum present in both sexes and the four large spines on the front edge of the mesonotum. In addition, on the pronotum there are paired structures in the form of distinct tubercles or short spines (anterolateral pronotals) and behind them a pair of very prominent spines (posterolateral pronotals). The spines on the pro- and mesonotum of the largest specimens examined from Mount Palali are less pronounced than those of the smaller specimens from other locations. In particular, the posterior pronotals are only developed as short and rather blunt, spiny tubercles, while in all other specimens they form strong, pointed spines.

Eubulides igorrote is the spiniest species of the genus, but unlike the also quite small Armadolides manobo, the only known species of the sister genus Armadolides, it has no spines or projections on the abdomen.

The projectile-shaped eggs are about 4.3 to 4.5 millimetres (0.17 to 0.18 in) long, 1.8 to 1.9 millimetres (0.071 to 0.075 in) wide and 1.5 to 1.8 millimetres (0.059 to 0.071 in) high. The lid (operculum) slopes slightly towards the dorsal side, creating a distinct opercular angle. It is slightly raised in the middle region and covered with hair-like shapes in this area. The micropylar plate is curved at the front end and parallel-sided in the middle region. The two posterior-lateral extensions extend over about a third of the micropylar plate. They become somewhat narrower towards the end and do not reach the end of the egg capsule. A distinct midline runs from the micropyle backwards and reaches the posterior pole of the egg.

== Occurrence ==
The species is native to the central northern part of Luzon. Here it has been recorded in the province of Nueva Vizcaya at Mount Palali and in Imugan, in the province of Ifugao in Kamandag and Banaue and in the Mountain Province at Mount Polis in Bontoc and in Sagada, as well as in Cadaclan.

== Taxonomy ==
James Abram Garfield Rehn and John William Holman Rehn described Eubulides igorrote as one of two new Eubulides species in 1939. The chosen species name "igorrote" is dedicated to the Igorot, an indigenous people living, among others, in Nueva Vizcaya, the type locality of the species. Rehn and Rehn described the species from an adult male from the collection of Morgan Hebard, which was collected by W. Boettcher on May 1, 1912, in Imugan in the province of Nueva Vizcaya. It is deposited as the holotype at the Academy of Natural Sciences in Philadelphia. This male was already missing the end of the abdomen at the time of description, so that the description had to remain incomplete in this regard and the body length could only be determined up to the existing sixth abdominal segment.

The initially unknown females were first described in detail in 2022 by Mescel S. Acola et al. The only female examined for this purpose, which was collected by Orlando L. Eusebio, S.A. Yap and M.V.C. Yngent in 2007 on Mount Palali, is relatively large at 58 millimetres (2.3 in) in length. The described adult male, which was collected together with the female and a juvenile male, is also larger than the rest of the specimens of the species examined. Frank H. Hennemann examined five other males and two other adult females, as well as a juvenile female from other locations. Of these, two females came from his collection, while the remaining specimens are deposited at the Museum of Natural Sciences in Brussels.

Many of the animals described as Eubulides igorrote in the 1990s and 2000s later turned out to be representatives of Eubulides timog, which was only described in 2023. Thus, the specimens described by Oliver Zompro in 1996 and re-imaged in 2004, as well as the eggs described by J. T. Clark Sellick in 1998 belong to Eubulides timog, as do the animals collected in 2009 by Joachim Bresseel and Thierry Heitzmann and in 2010 by Bresseel, Heitzmann, Tim Bollens and Rob Krijns.

Sarah Bank et al. examined samples from five representatives of the genus Eubulides in their study published in 2021 based on genetic analysis to clarify the phylogeny of the Heteropterygidae. Three proved to be conspecific and were identified as Eubulides igorrote.

== In terraristics ==
As with the scientifically studied animals, the animals kept in the terrariums of hobbyists were also confused with Eubulides timog. A breeding line that goes back to specimens collected by Bresseel and Heitzmann in Infanta in 2009 was listed by the Phasmid Study Group under the PSG number 311 until 2019 as Eubulides igorrote. It has only been referred to as Eubulides timog since 2024. Although Eubulides igorrote was collected in 2013 by Heitzmann and Albert Kang in Nueva Vizscaya and in 2014 by Bresseel, Jérôme Constant and their companions on Mount Polis in Sagada and partly arrived in Europe alive, no breeding line could be established from these animals.
