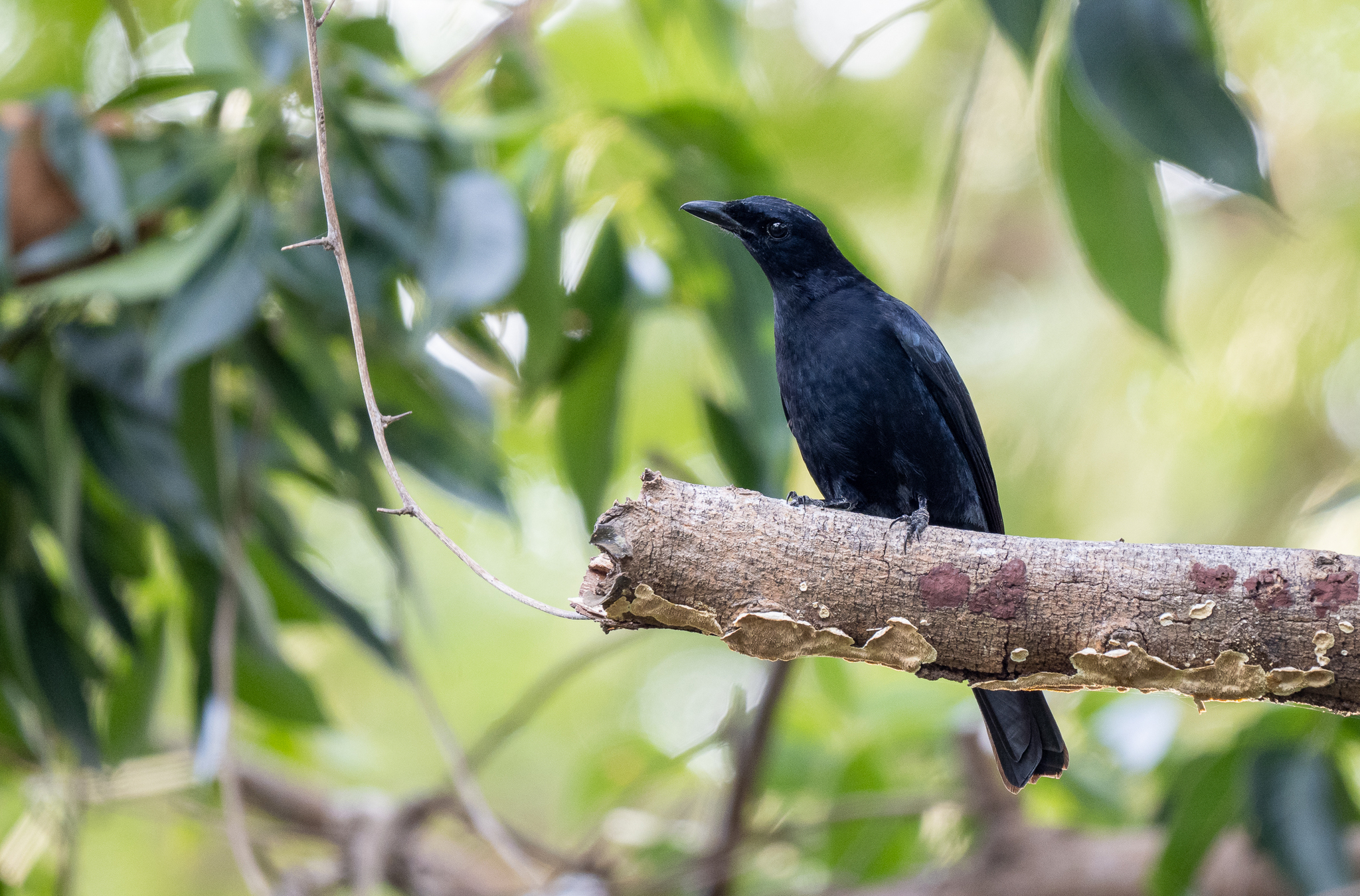

Conservation status
- Least Concern (IUCN 3.1)

Scientific classification
- Kingdom: Animalia
- Phylum: Chordata
- Class: Aves
- Order: Passeriformes
- Family: Campephagidae
- Genus: Edolisoma
- Species: E. coerulescens

Binomial name
- Edolisoma coerulescens (Blyth, 1842)

Synonyms
- Coracina coerulescens Analisoma coerulescens

= Blackish cuckooshrike =

Species of bird

The blackish cuckooshrike (Edolisoma coerulescens) or the blackish cicadabird or Luzon graybird, is a species of bird in the family Campephagidae. It is endemic to the Philippines on the islands of Luzon, Catanduanes, Marinduque and Cebu where it is presumed extinct. Some taxonomists place this species in the genus Analisoma. Its natural habitat is tropical moist lowland forest where it is believed to be declining due to habitat loss.

== Description ==
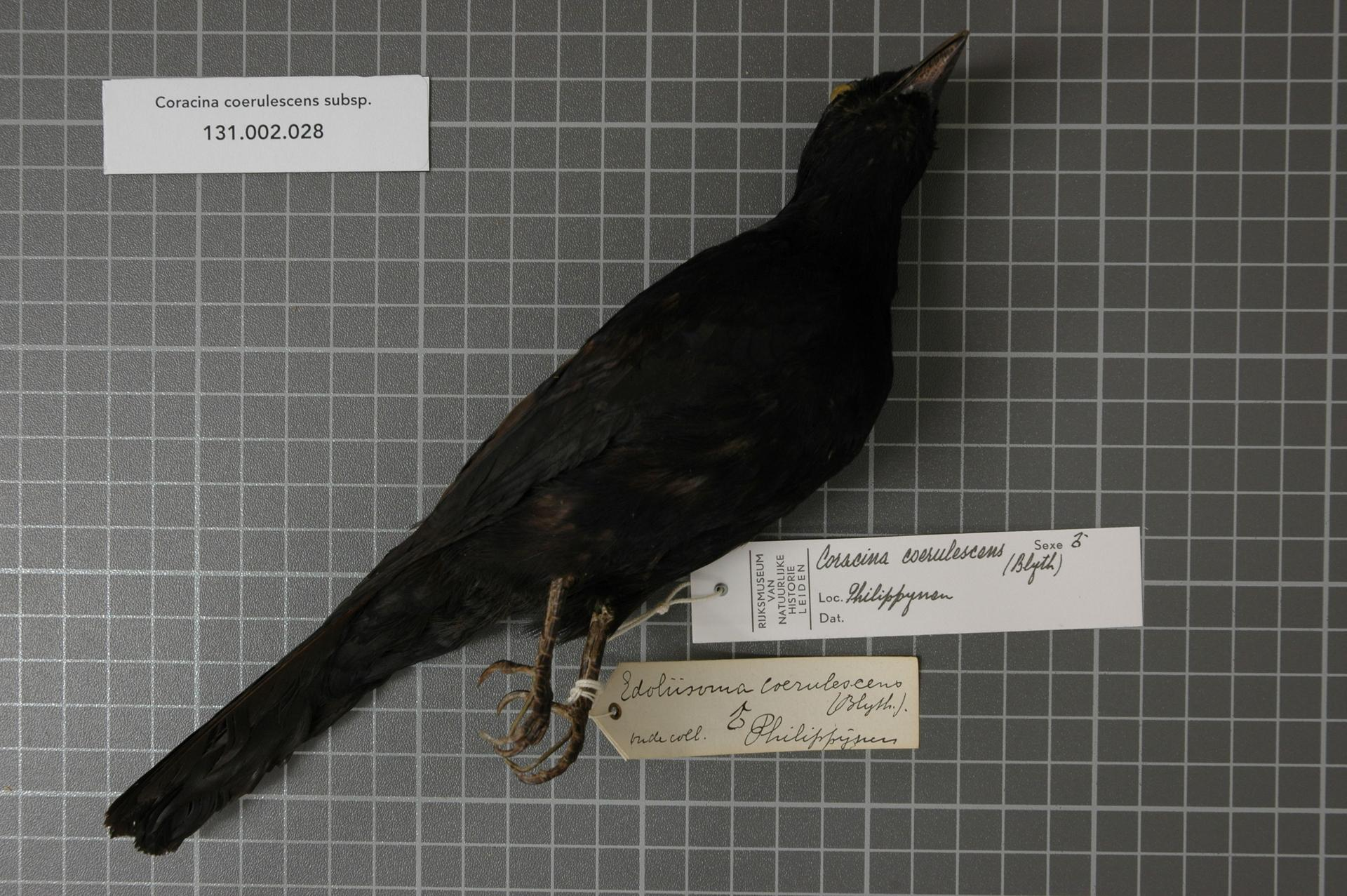
A specimen from the Naturalis Biodiversity Center

=== Subspecies ===
Three subspecies are recognized:

- E. c. coerulescens — Found on Luzon and Catanduanes
- E. c. deschauenseei — Found on Marinduque; slightly less purple
- E. c. altera †— Found on Cebu; now extinct

== Ecology and behavior ==
Its diet has not yet been recorded but it is presumed to feed on insects. Occurs singly, in small groups or with mixed-species flocks of other medium-sized birds like Bar-bellied cuckooshrike, Black-naped oriole, and Black-bibbed cicadabird. Typically forages in the canopy.

There is no information about its breeding habits and nesting aside from a female collected in March contained an egg.

== Habitat and conservation status ==
Its natural habitat is tropical moist lowland forest up to 1,000 m where it forages in the canopy and upper story in mixed-species flocks.

The IUCN Red list has classified this species as least-concern but is declining due to deforestation for lumber, mining and farmlands. There are no known targeted conservation actions for this bird, but it will indirectly benefit from the conservation of other North Luzon species like the Critically Endangered Isabela oriole.

It occurs in protected areas like Northern Sierra Madre Natural Park, Bataan National Park, Aurora Memorial National Park, Quezon Protected Landscape but actual protection from deforestation and hunting are lax.
