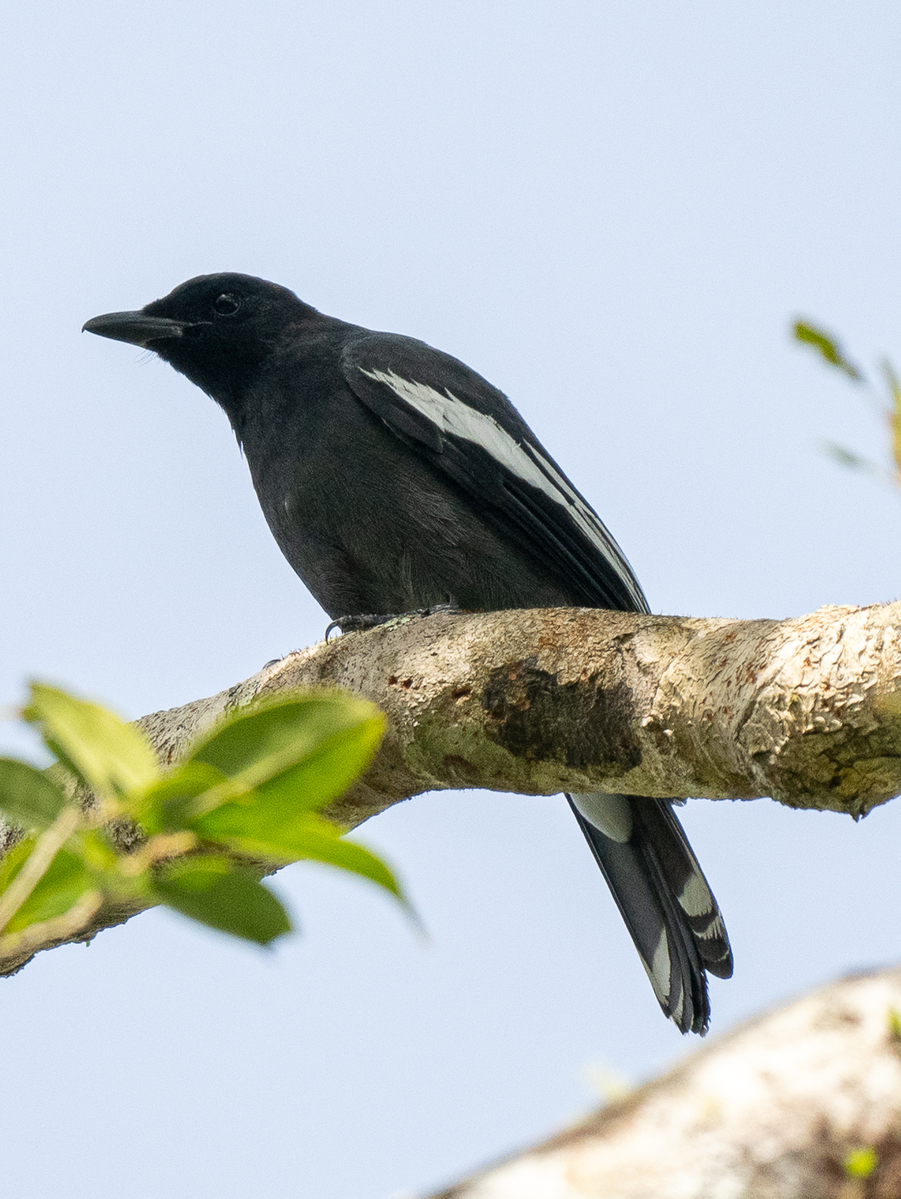
- Male
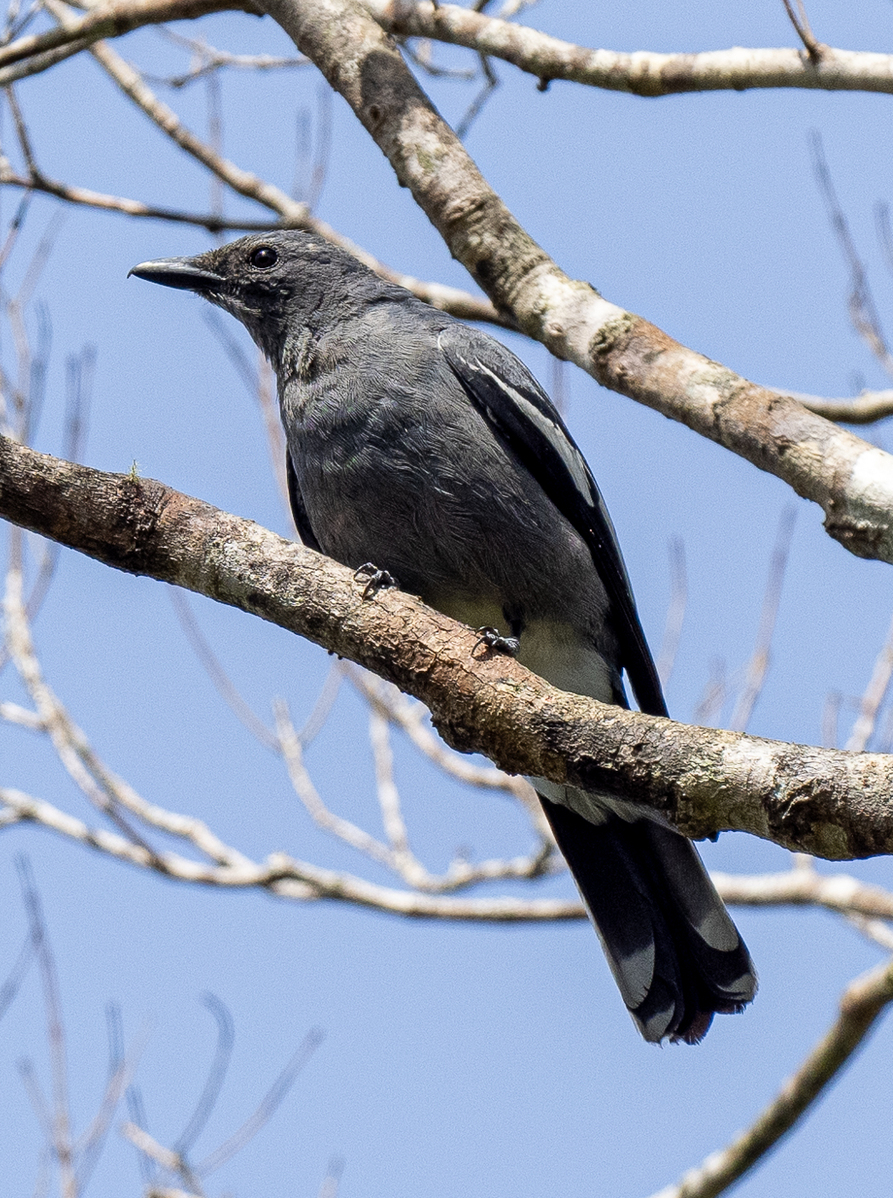
- Female

Conservation status
- Near Threatened (IUCN 3.1)

Scientific classification
- Kingdom: Animalia
- Phylum: Chordata
- Class: Aves
- Order: Passeriformes
- Family: Campephagidae
- Genus: Edolisoma
- Species: E. ostentum

Binomial name
- Edolisoma ostentum (Ripley, 1952)

Synonyms
- Coracina ostenta Analisoma ostenta

= White-winged cuckooshrike =

Species of bird

The white-winged cuckooshrike (Edolisoma ostentum), also known as white-winged cicadabird or white-winged graybird, is a species of bird in the family Campephagidae. It is endemic to the Philippines found on the islands of Negros, Panay and formerly (now extinct) on Guimaras. Some taxonomists place this species in the genus Analisoma.

Its natural habitats are tropical moist lowland forest. It is threatened by habitat loss.

== Description ==
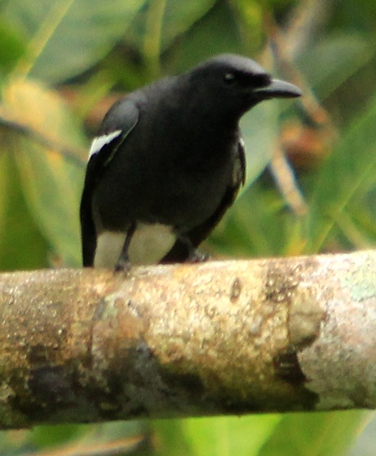
A male in Balinsasayao Twin Lakes Natural Park

A medium bird of the forests of Panay and Negros. It has a gray crown, back and rump. Wings are primarily black with a white wingpart, tail is also black with white tips and vent. This species exhibits sexual dimorphism in which the male is much darker than pale females.

Its call is described as a sharp downward chirp often repeated 10-20 times.

This species is monotypic and has no subspecies.

== Ecology and behavior ==
Feeds on large adult and larval insects. Occurs singly, in small groups or with mixed-species flocks of other medium-sized birds like Visayan cuckooshrike. They can form flocks of up to 8-10 birds.Typically forages in the canopy.

Breeds from February to September. Nest is undescribed but supposedly recorded 20 meters above the ground on a forked branch. Clutch size is 2 to 3 eggs. Both male and females feed and care for the chick.

== Habitat and conservation status ==
Its natural habitats at tropical moist lowland primary forest and secondary forest up to 1,300 meters above sea level. While they can tolerate secondary forest, they have the highest population densities and health in primary (old-growth) forest.

As of 2025, This species is assessed as Near-threatened species by the International Union for Conservation of Nature. The population is believed to be declining with populations estimated between 2,500 and 9,999 mature individuals. Prior to 2025, this species was listed Vulnerable species.

Its main threat is habitat destruction through both legal and Illegal logging, conversion into farmlands through Slash-and-burn, charcoal burning, and mining. Its preference for low altitudes suggests that it must have suffered population losses with the loss of lowland forest in the Philippines. Habitat loss on both Negros and Panay has been extensive. By 2007, Negros and Panay had a 3% and 6% remaining forest cover with most of this being higher elevation forest where this bird does not thrive in with these figures are still declining.

It occurs in a few protected areas on Northern Negros Natural Park, Mount Kanlaon National Park and Northwest Panay Peninsula Natural Park. However, as with most areas in the Philippines, protection from hunting and illegal logging is lax.

Conservation actions proposed are surveys particularly on Panay, to identify further key populations. Formally protect the Central Panay Mountain Range and other key sites. Promote more effective protection measures for the Northern Negros Natural Park. Encourage careful reforestation activities around remaining forests with emphasis on native trees.
