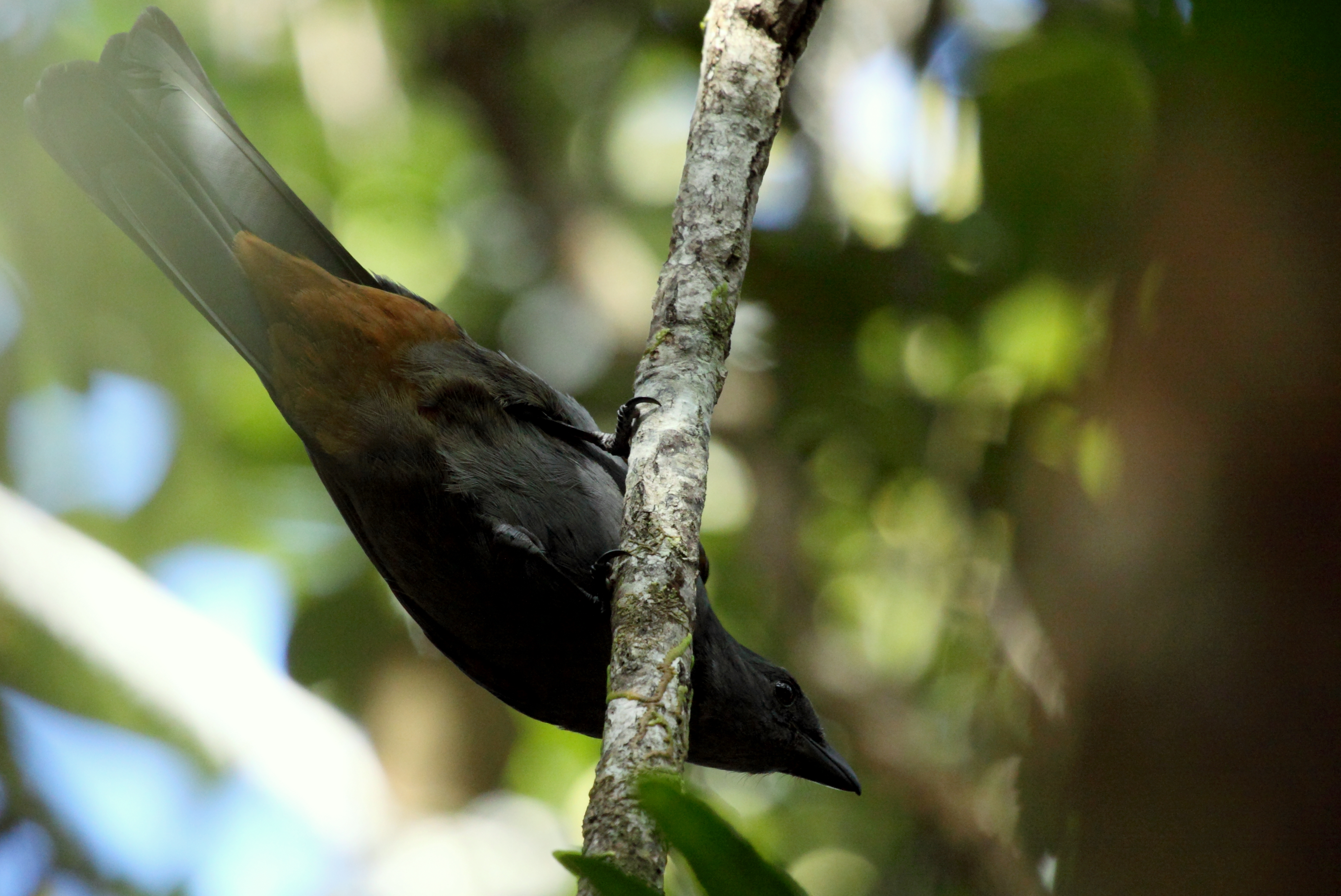
- New Caledonian cuckooshrike (Analisoma analis)

Scientific classification
- Kingdom: Animalia
- Phylum: Chordata
- Class: Aves
- Order: Passeriformes
- Family: Campephagidae
- Genus: Analisoma; Mathews, 1928

Species
- See text

= Analisoma =

Genus of birds

Analisoma is a genus of bird in the family Campephagidae that is recognized in some taxonomies. Many taxonomists consider this genus conspecific with the genus Edolisoma. It contains the following species:

- New Caledonian cuckooshrike (Analisoma analis), or (Edolisoma anale)
- White-winged cuckooshrike (Analisoma ostenta)
- Blackish cuckooshrike (Analisoma coerulescens)
