= Atimonan =

Municipality in Quezon, Philippines

- Municipality
- Municipality of Atimonan
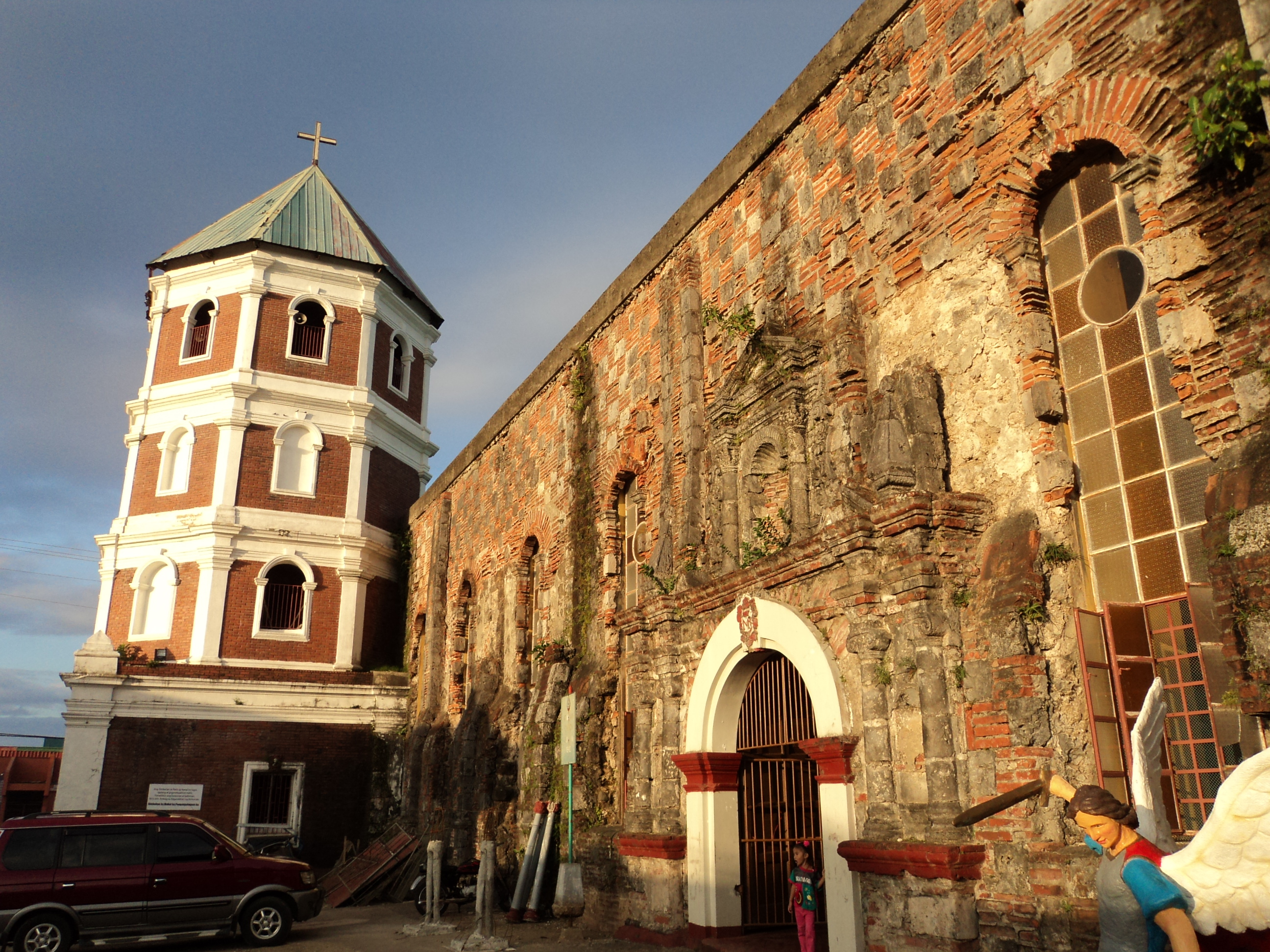
- Side view of Our Lady of the Angels Parish

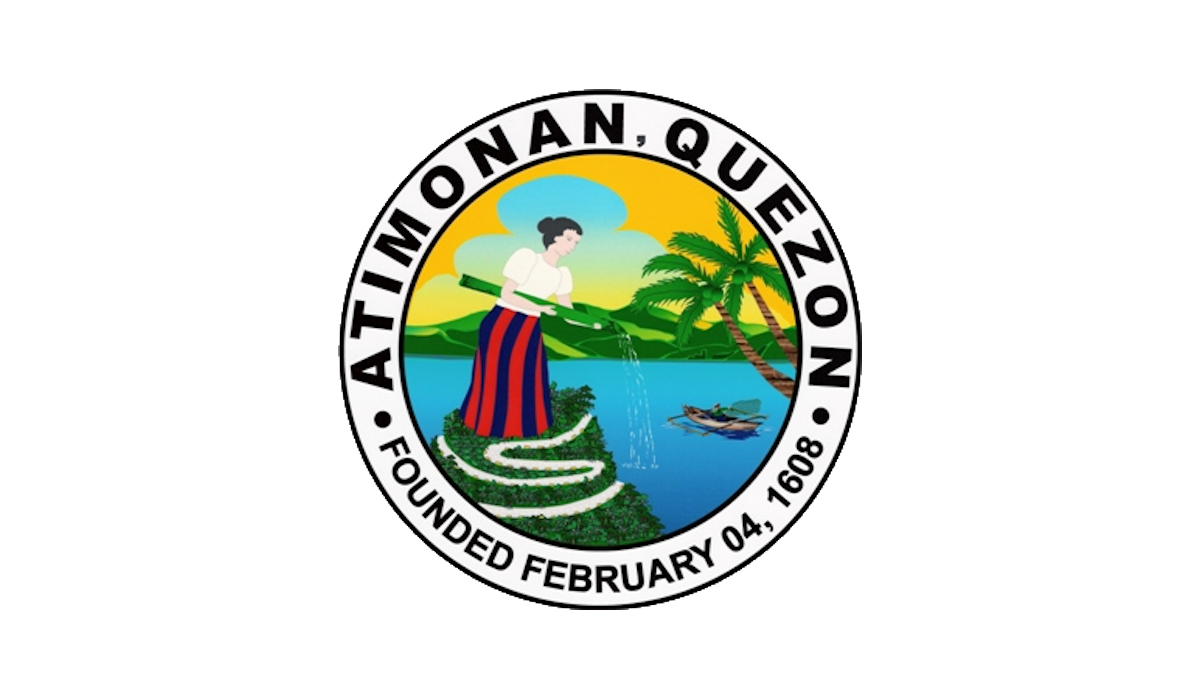
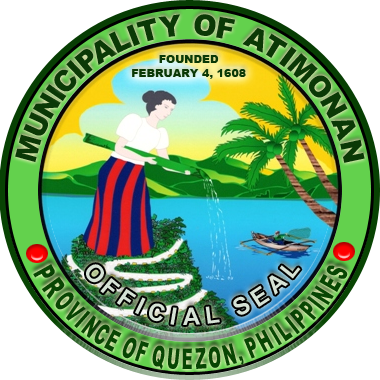
- Flag Seal
- Motto: Tulong-tulong sa Asenso, Mamamayan ang Panalo! English: Helping for Progress, the People Are Won!
- Anthem: Atimonan, Aking Bayan; English: Atimonan, My Town
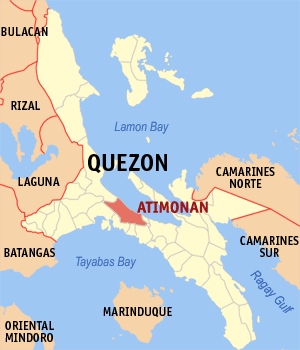
- Map of Quezon with Atimonan highlighted
- Interactive map of Atimonan
- Location within the Philippines
- Coordinates: 14°00′13″N 121°55′11″E
- Country: Philippines
- Region: Calabarzon
- Province: Quezon
- District: 4th district
- Founded: February 4, 1608
- Barangays: 42 (see Barangays)

Government
  - Type: Sangguniang Bayan
  - Mayor: Rustico Joven U. Mendoza
  - Vice Mayor: Zenaida D. Veranga
  - Representative: Keith Micah DL. Tan
  - Municipal Council: Members: Antonio V. Diestro; Estela A. Lim; Renato C. Sarmiento; Rumel L. Verastigue; Angeza Mae A. Tamayo; Cielyn D. Makayan; Nelmer V. Santander; Roseller A. Magtibay
  - Electorate: 37,532 voters (2025)

Area
  - Total: 239.66 km^{2} (92.53 sq mi)
- Elevation: 42 m (138 ft)
- Highest elevation: 319 m (1,047 ft)
- Lowest elevation: 0 m (0 ft)

Population (2024 census)
  - Total: 65,552
  - Density: 273.52/km^{2} (708.42/sq mi)
  - Households: 16,701
- Demonym: Atimonanin

Economy
  - Income class: 1st municipal income class
  - Poverty incidence: 5.55% (2023)
  - Revenue: ₱ 313.1 million (2024)
  - Assets: ₱ 611.6 million (2024)
  - Liabilities: ₱ 57.84 million (2024)
  - Expenditure: ₱ 282.2 million (2024)

Service provider
  - Electricity: Quezon 1 Electric Cooperative (QUEZELCO 1)
- Time zone: UTC+8 (PST)
- ZIP code: 4331
- PSGC: 0405603000
- IDD : area code: +63 (0)42
- Native languages: Tagalog
- Website: www.atimonan.gov.ph

Atimonan, officially the Municipality of Atimonan (Tagalog: Bayan ng Atimonan), is a municipality in the province of Quezon, Philippines. According to the 2024 census, it has a population of 65,552 people.

== Etymology ==
There are three plausible origins of the name of the municipality:

1. Atimon, an extinct tree alleged to have been prevalent in the area and had reportedly served many uses to the residents;
2. The Tagalog phrase atin muna, signifying a policy, unity of feeling, and sentiments among the residents that bolster their spirit in the fight against their enemies during that time; and
3. Simeona Mangaba, known to her townmates as Ate Monang, who was the older sister of the first town captain Francisco Mangaba and the founder of the town. This is the most popular version.

== History ==
Atimonan was founded by Simeona Mangaba on February 4, 1608, along the banks of the Maling River, now known as Atimonan River.

Living along the riverbank, the people have always been prey to Moro attacks and so for fear of Moro reprisals, the inhabitants decided to transfer to Palsabangon, now a barrio of Pagbilao. However, the people felt discontented in Palsabangon because the place abounds in wild crocodiles that from time to time disturbed them. So, in 1610, after two years of stay, they left the place and transferred to Babyaw, a part of Atimonan. They settled in Babyaw for almost 14 years but transferred again to another site called Minanukan for some unknown reasons.

In 1635, they again transferred to another place called Bisita, but some families separated from the majority and settled in Yawe, now San Isidro in what is now Padre Burgos. The next year, when Simeona Mangaba learned of what happened to the original group of settlers, she, together with Fray Geronimo de Jesus, a Spanish friar, tried to unite them once more and convinced them to return to the place where it was first founded. The place is known now as Bagumbayan was during the time of Captain Pablo Garcia.

On January 1, 1917, barrio Laguimanoc was separated from Atimonan to become an independent municipality that is now known as Padre Burgos. On December 23, 1941, the occupying Japanese Imperial Army landed on beaches in Atimonan.

== Geography ==
Atimonan lies on the eastern shore of the province, 42 kilometers (26 mi) from Lucena and 172 kilometers (107 mi) southeast of Manila. Atimonan is bounded by the municipalities of Gumaca, Plaridel, Pagbilao and Padre Burgos.

=== Barangays ===
Atimonan is politically subdivided into 42 barangays, as indicated below. Each barangay consists of puroks and some have sitios.

- Angeles
- Balubad
- Balugohin
- Barangay Zone 1 (Poblacion)
- Barangay Zone 2 (Poblacion)
- Barangay Zone 3 (Poblacion)
- Barangay Zone 4 (Poblacion)
- Buhangin
- Caridad Ibaba
- Caridad Ilaya
- Habingan
- Inaclagan
- Inalig
- Kilait
- Kulawit
- Lakip
- Lubi
- Lumutan
- Magsaysay
- Malinao Ibaba
- Malinao Ilaya
- Malusak
- Manggalayan Bundok
- Manggalayan Labak
- Matanag
- Montes Balaon
- Montes Kallagan
- Ponon
- Rizal
- San Andres Bundok
- San Andres Labak
- San Isidro
- San Jose Balatok
- San Rafael
- Santa Catalina
- Sapaan
- Sokol
- Tagbakin
- Talaba
- Tinandog
- Villa Ibaba
- Villa Ilaya

=== Climate ===
Climate data for Atimonan, Quezon
Month	Jan	Feb	Mar	Apr	May	Jun	Jul	Aug	Sep	Oct	Nov	Dec	Year
Mean daily maximum °C (°F)	31.6 (88.9)	32 (90)	34 (93)	34.6 (94.3)	35.6 (96.1)	36 (97)	35 (95)	35 (95)	35.3 (95.5)	35 (95)	33 (91)	32 (90)	34.1 (93.4)
Mean daily minimum °C (°F)	21 (70)	20.3 (68.5)	21.3 (70.3)	21 (70)	22.6 (72.7)	23 (73)	23 (73)	23 (73)	23 (73)	23 (73)	23.3 (73.9)	23.3 (73.9)	22.3 (72.0)
Average precipitation mm (inches)	156.6 (6.17)	169.3 (6.67)	109 (4.3)	60.9 (2.40)	198.9 (7.83)	235.4 (9.27)	262.7 (10.34)	156.2 (6.15)	234.5 (9.23)	326.8 (12.87)	346.6 (13.65)	304.3 (11.98)	2,561.2 (100.86)
Average rainy days	22	6	6	5	15	15	13	14	8	22	17	16	159
Source: MDRRMO Atimonan

== Demographics ==
Population census of Atimonan
Year	Pop.	±% p.a.
1903	11,203	—
1918	13,087	+1.04%
1939	18,512	+1.67%
1948	21,474	+1.66%
1960	32,294	+3.46%
1970	35,478	+0.94%
1975	37,483	+1.11%
1980	39,894	+1.25%
1990	46,651	+1.58%
1995	54,283	+2.88%
2000	56,716	+0.94%
2007	59,157	+0.58%
2010	61,587	+1.48%
2015	63,432	+0.56%
2020	64,260	+0.27%
2024	65,552	+0.48%
Source: Philippine Statistics Authority

People from Atimonan are called Atimonanins. The primary language is Tagalog, with many local phrases and expressions. Manilans usually understand Atimonan Tagalog, albeit with some frustrations. Atimonanins are mostly Tagalogs, but some have a small percentage of Chinese and Spanish ancestry. Some Atimonanins can also speak Bicolano, Lan-nang, or Spanish.

=== Religion ===
The dominant religion in Atimonan is Roman Catholic. The culture in Atimonan is primarily ingrained in rural maritime Filipino settings. Other religions present are:

- The Church of Jesus Christ of Latter-day Saints (LDS) (commonly known as Mormon)
- Atimonan United Christian Ministries AUCM (Born-Again Christians)
- Iglesia Ni Cristo
- Seventh Day Adventist
- Jehovah's Witnesses
- Philippine Independent Church/ Iglesia Filipina Independiente (known as Aglipayans)
- Islam
- Members Church of God International commonly known as Ang Dating Daan

==== Our Lady of Angels Parish ====
Our Lady of Angels Parish is a member of Roman Catholic Diocese of Lucena.

- Parish Priest: Rev. Msgr. Emmanuel Ma. Villareal
- Parochial Vicar: Rev. Fr. Merlin Las Piñas
- Parochial Vicar: Rev. Fr. Ralph Peñaflorida
- Assisting Priest : Rev. Fr. Paul Liwanag

Parish of Our Lady of Angels (Philippine Independent Church)

- Parish Priest - Rev. Fr. Arnold Manalo Damayan, BTh, BAPA

==== Philippine Good News International ====
- Ptra. Analiza Satrain

==== Jesus Is Lord Church Atimonan Chapter ====
- Ptr. Ding Oraa

== Economy ==
Poverty incidence of Atimonan (%)

Source: Philippine Statistics Authority

The economy of Atimonan is sustained by fishing and agriculture. Many also engage in seafaring.

== Tourism ==
The town is part of the Tourism Highway Program of the Department of Tourism.

- Quezon Protected Landscape
- ACEDRE Beach Resort
- Atimonan Feeder Port
- Pinagbanderahan Summit
- Bantakay Fall and Caves
- Atimonan Bay Park
- Atimonan Fish Port
- Atimonan Fish Sanctuary
- De Gracia Beach Floating Cottage
- Green Park Hotel and Resort
- Missy and Zane Hotel de Recepcion
- Villarreal Beach
- Rizza Beach Resort (D'Bay Resort)
- Playa De Lucia Hotel, Resorts and Restaurant
- Tinandog Heights
- Quezon National Park
- ZigZag Park
- Lumiliay Waterfalls
- Malusak Cave
- Cueva Santa
- Aloco Falls
- Robert's Kainan
- Taluo Falls (Coco)

== Culture ==
=== Festivals ===
Tagultol Fishing Festival

The Tagultol Festival is an evolution of various cultural activities, practised in previous years by Atimonanins. The Town and Patronal Fiesta every August 1 and 2, is simply celebrated with the usual parade, a cultural program, thanksgiving mass and procession. In 1981, during the administration of then Quezon Board Member and then Mayor of Atimonan Remedios V. Diestro, an activity was started – the Karakol. It is a fluvial parade held in the afternoon of the 2nd day of the fiesta. The boats travelled around Lamon Bay within the boundaries of the town proper headed by the Grand Boat, where the patron—Nuestra Señora de Los Angeles—was aboard. There were singing, dancing and band playing, all in expression of gratitude to the Almighty for the year's bountiful catch. The parade then joined the religious procession and ended at the church.

Later, it was done in the morning after the Thanksgiving mass at the Fishing Port and Boat Racing Competition, followed by the Karakol. The creation of the Lupong Tagapangasiwa ng Kultura at Sining sa Atimonan (LUPTAKSA) under the leadership of Mr. Francisco T. Laude, a retired public school teacher, put a new dimension and vigour to the town's cultural awareness and in the year 2003, the Tagultol Festival was finally launched. Tagultol, an old fishing method used by Atimonanins, was derived from the Tagalog word ugtol, meaning bounce. Tagultol fishing consists of a rectangular stone tied at the end of abaca strings dipped in honey.

Thorns of calamansi & similar plants with bait were tied 2 feet above the stone before dipping in water and moved in a bouncing movement. The festival is a five-day celebration starting on July 29 until August 2. The celebration is an array of both cultural and sports activities, talent and beauty contests participated by community organisations and individuals and headed by the local government's culture and arts council (LUPTAKSA) and Atimonan Tourism Council.

It can be held in Aliwan Fiesta 2018 during the festival is the Tagultol Fishing Festival, represented by: Atimonan Community Dancers.

The street dance is 15 members says: "The progressive town of Atimonan lies on the western shore of the province of Quezon, bound by flourishing gifts of nature and the abundance of Lamon Bay. The creation of the Tagultol Fishing Festival 15 years ago brought new vigour to Atimonan’s cultural awareness, as well as an expression of gratitude to the Almighty and the town’s patroness Nuestra Señora de los Angeles for the bountiful catch received by fisherfolk. The festival shows the old fishing method of “ugtol,” a Tagalog word meaning “bounce”. Tagultol fishing consists of a rectangular stone tied to a piece of abaca string dipped in honey to make it more resilient in salt water. The original music was composed by Francisco Laude, founder of Lupong Tagapangasiwa ng Kultura at Sining sa Atimonan. Please welcome the Atimonan Community Dancers’ portrayal of the Tagultol Fishing festival!"

Pabitin Festival

The Town of Atimonan celebrates the Pabitin Festival every May 15 in honour of the patron saint of farmers, St. Isidore, almost the same in Lucban's Pahiyas Festival. During this festival, every house in the town proper has hanging decor such as vegetables, fruits, suman, dried fish wrapped in plastic and any other kinds of food, and when the statue of St. Isidore have passed the street, then the decoration will be thrown in the people who want to have the decorations.

== Education ==
The Atimonan Schools District Office governs all educational institutions within the municipality. It oversees the management and operations of all private and public, from primary to secondary schools.

=== Primary and elementary schools ===
- Atimonan United Methodist Christian School
- Atimonan Central Elementary School
- Atimonan Central School (Annex)
- Buhangin Elementary School
- Balubad Elementary School
- Caridad Ibaba Elementary School
- Casa dei Patino Montessori School
- Little Angels Montessori Learning Center
- Inalig Elementary School
- Magsaysay Elementary School
- Maligaya Elementary School
- Malinao Ibaba Elementary School
- Malinao Ilaya Elementary School
- Malusak Elementary School
- Our Lady of the Angels Academy
- Ponon Elementary School
- Rizal Elementary School
- San Rafael Elementary School
- Sapaan Elementary School
- Santa Catalina Elementary School (Annex)
- St. Louie Kids World Learning Center
- Tagbakin Elementary School

=== Secondary schools ===
- Atimonan National Comprehensive High School
- Balugohin Integrated National High School
- Maligaya National High School
- Malinao Ilaya Integrated National High School
- Malusak National High School
- San Rafael National High School

=== Higher educational institutions ===
- ACEBA Science & Technology Institute
- College of Science, Technology & Communication
- Leon Guinto Memorial College
- Our Lady of the Angels Academy
- Quezonian Educational College

== Government ==
=== Local government ===
Municipal officials (2010–2013):

- Municipal Mayor: Jose F. Mendoza
- Municipal Vice Mayor: Joel M. Vergano
- Municipal Councilors:
  - Zenaida D. Veranga
  - Renato C. Sarmiento
  - Cielyn S. Diestro
  - Elmer M. Santander
  - Maria Aurora A. Tamayo
  - Nestor E. Santander
  - John Francis L. Luzano
  - Roseller A. Magtibay
- PPLB President: Ernesto S. Amandy
- PPSK President: Loid John L. Vergaño

Municipal officials (2013-2016):

- Municipal Mayor: Jose F. Mendoza
- Municipal Vice Mayor: Joel M. Vergaño
- Municipal Councilors:
  - Zenaida D. Veranga
  - Rizaldy L. Velasco
  - Renato C. Sarmiento
  - Elmer M. Santander
  - Iñigo P. Mapaye
  - Cielyn S. Diestro-Makayan
  - Roseller A. Magtibay
  - John Francis L. Luzano
- PPLB President: Ernesto S. Amandy

Municipal Officials (2016-2019)

- Municipal Mayor: Engr. Rustico Joven U. Mendoza
- Municipal Vice Mayor: Zenaida D. Veranga
- Municipal Councilors:
  - Elmer M. Santander
  - Rizaldy L. Velasco
  - Nestor E. Santander
  - Estela A. Lim
  - Roseller A. Magtibay
  - Maria Aurora A. Tamayo
  - Nestor V. Laude
  - Merlinda C. Pesigan
  - PPLB President:Amado A. Vidal
  - PPSK President: Dexter B. Alegre

== Gallery ==
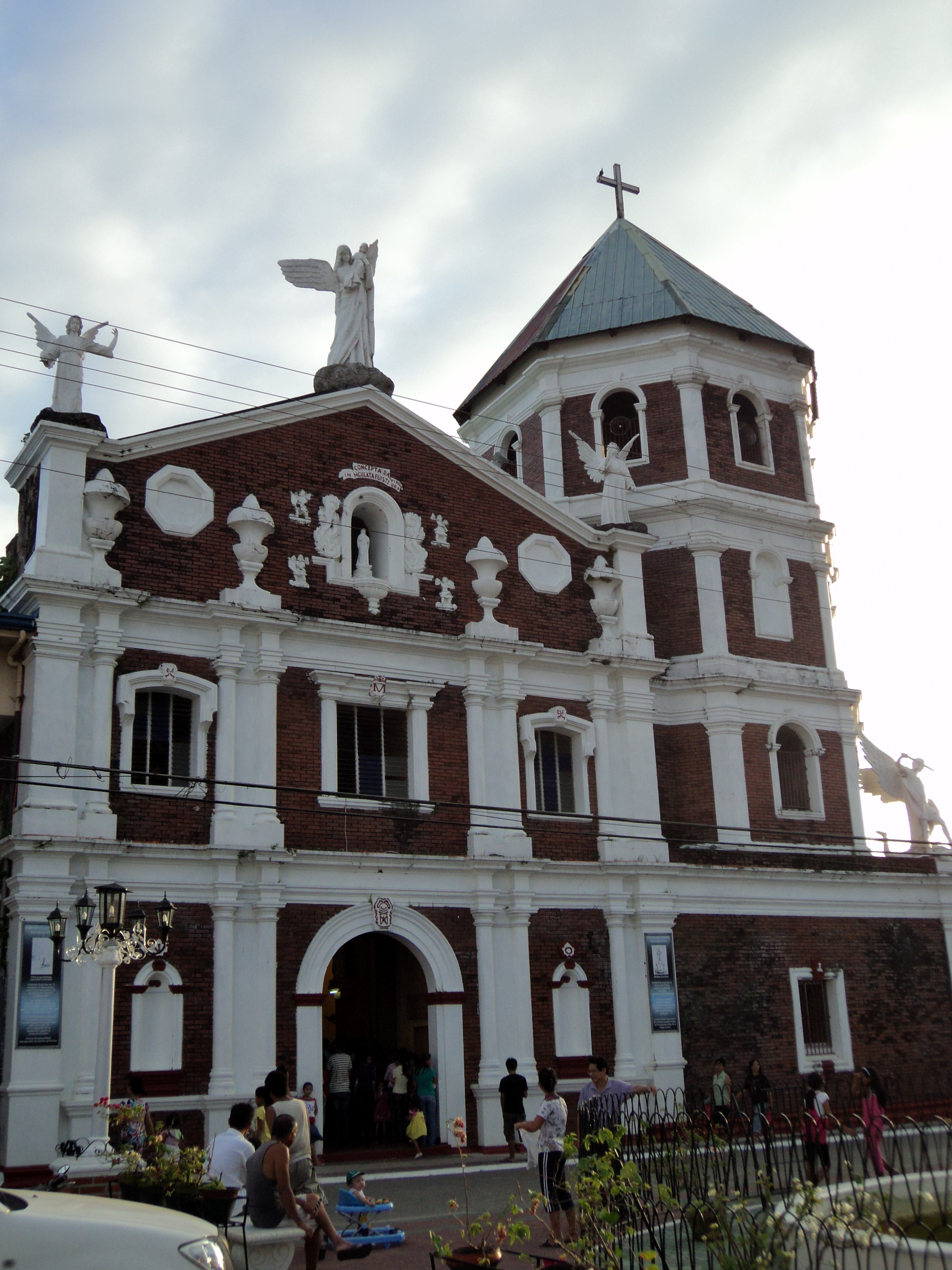
Our Lady of the Angels Parish

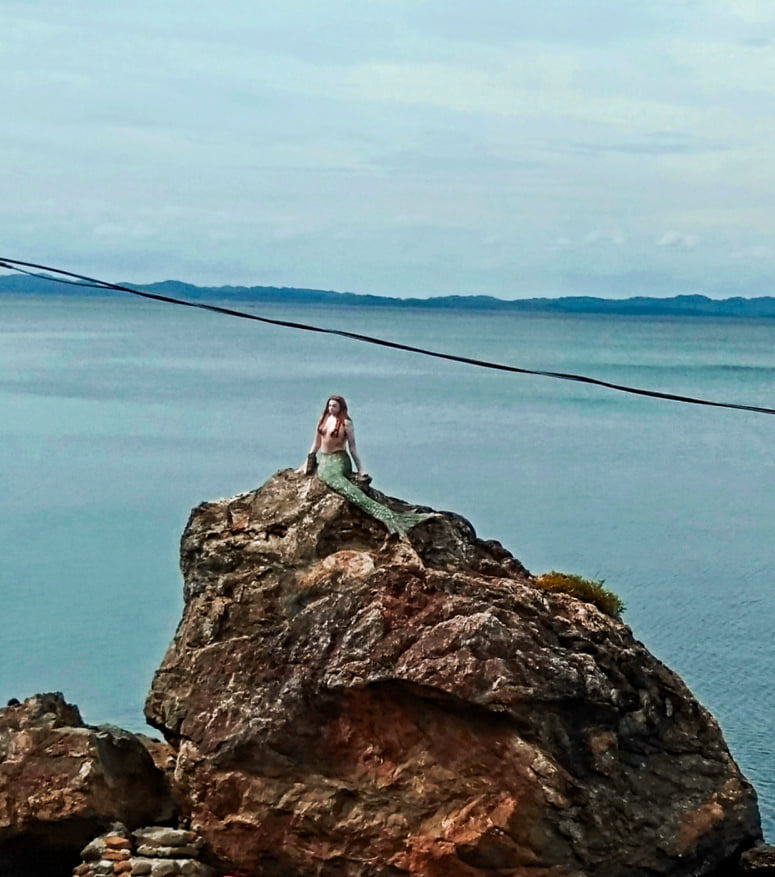
Mermaid statue of Atimonan

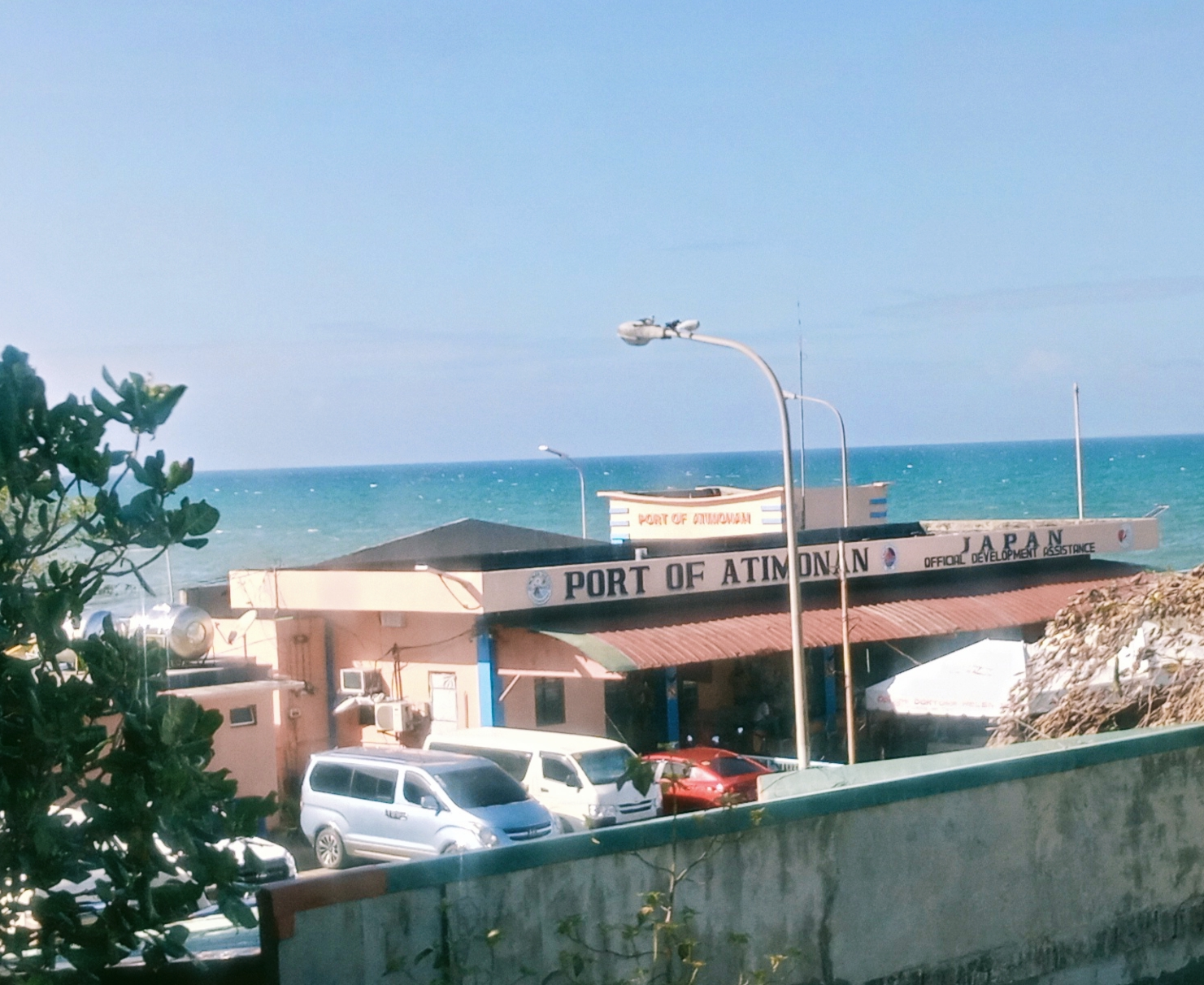
Port of Atimonan

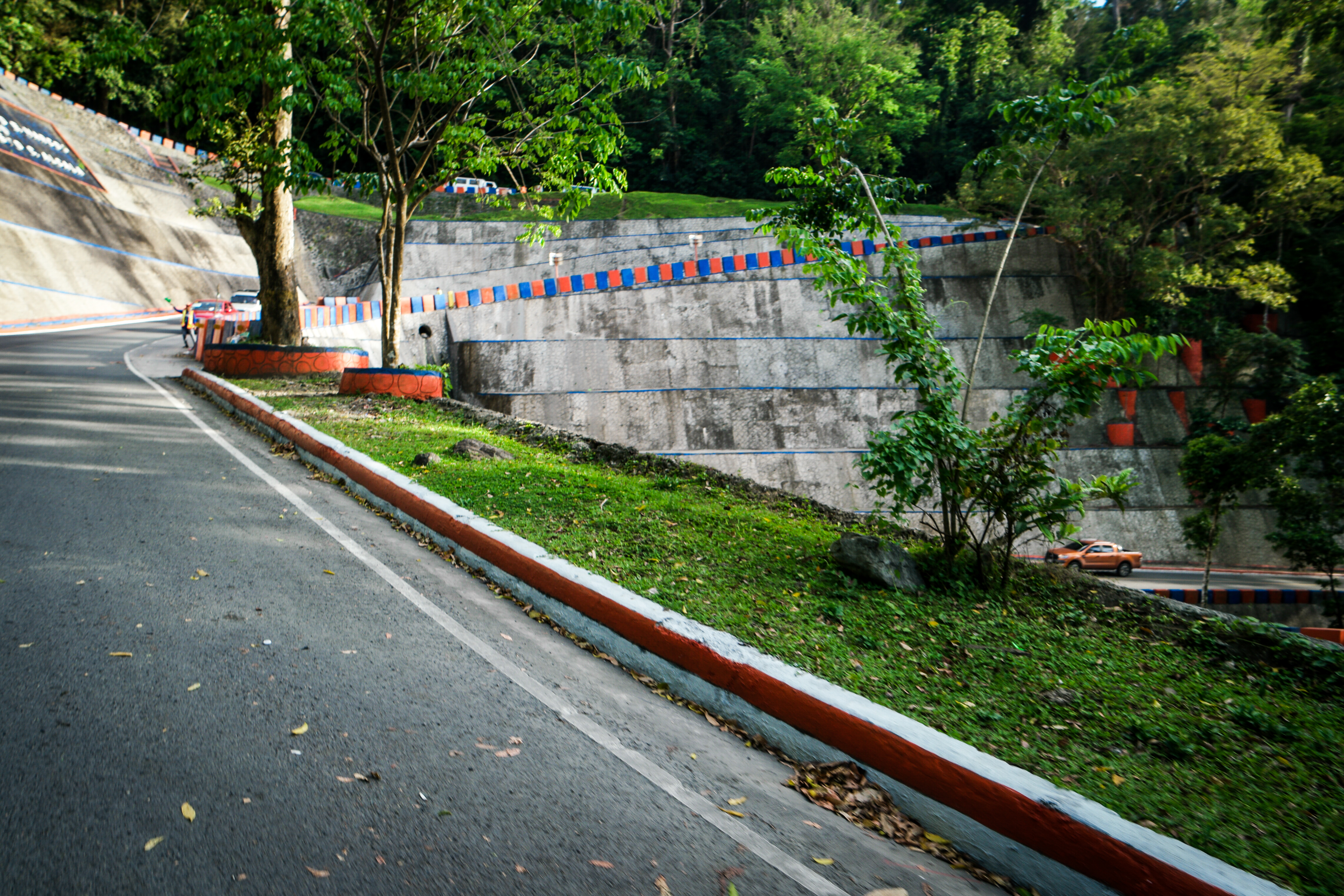
Old Zigzag Road in Quezon National Park

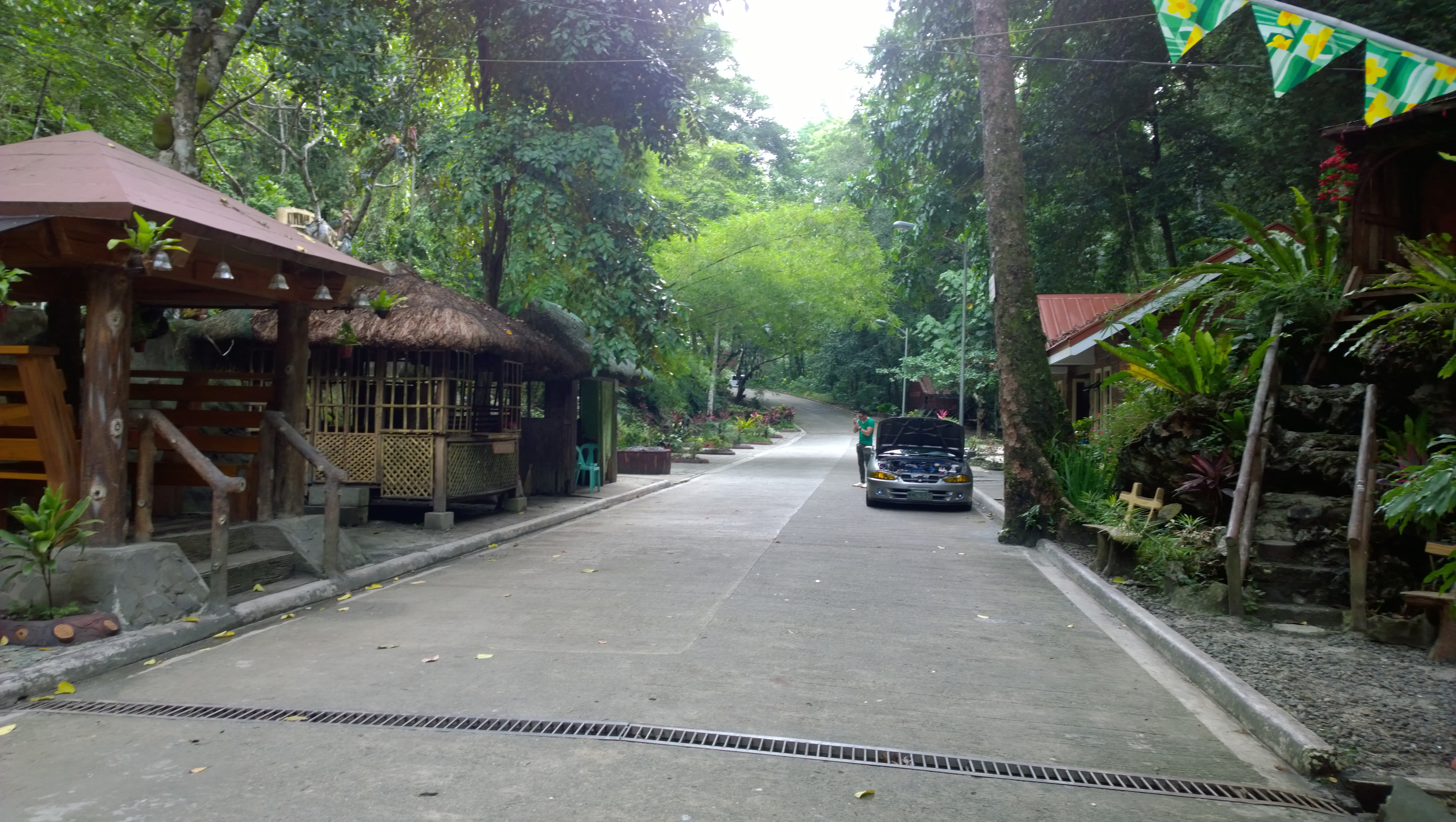
Atimonan Zigzag Park
