= Quezon Protected Landscape =

Protected area in the Republic of the Philippines

- IUCN category V (protected landscape/seascape)
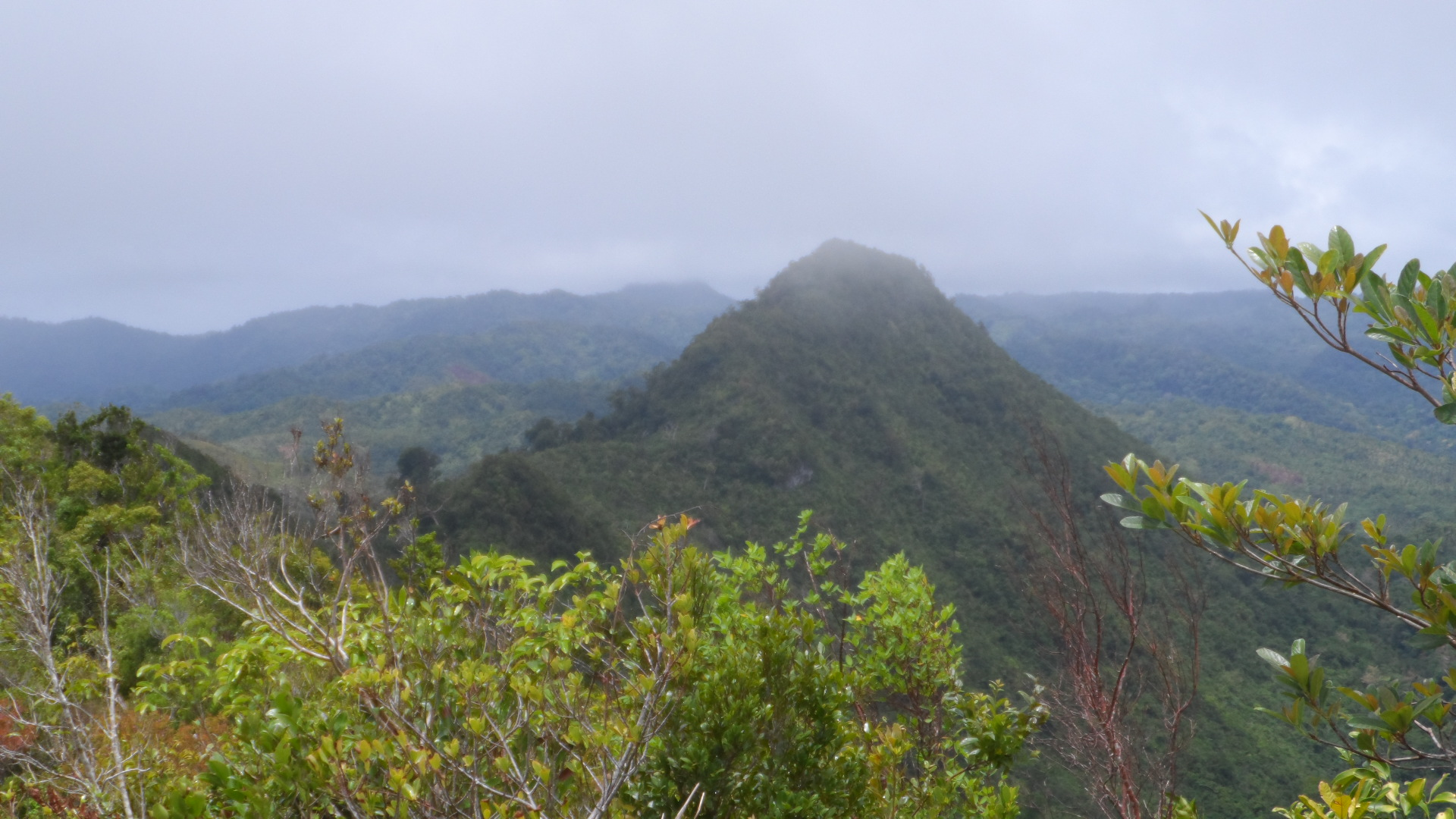
- Quezon National Forest Park in Atimonan, Quezon

- Location within Philippines
- Location: Calabarzon, Philippines
- Nearest city: Lucena, Philippines
- Coordinates: 13°59′22″N 121°48′59″E
- Area: 9.38 km^{2} (3.62 sq mi)
- Established: June 2, 2003 by Proc. 394
- Named for: Manuel Quezon, President of the Philippines
- Governing body: Department of Environment and Natural Resources
- Owner: Government of the Republic of the Philippines

The Quezon Protected Landscape is a protected area in the Republic of the Philippines, spanning the municipalities of Pagbilao, Padre Burgos and Atimonan in Quezon province. The park is situated north of the narrowest section of Luzon in Quezon province, located about 164 km (102 mi) southeast of Metro Manila.

== Protected area ==
The park was first established as a national park on October 25, 1934, with Proclamation no. 740. The parks has a total area of 535.08 hectares (1,322.2 acres) and was named as Quezon National Park. The park was enlarged to 983 hectares (2,430 acres) with Proclamation no. 594 on August 5, 1940. After the implementation of the National Integrated Protected Areas System (NIPAS) in 1992, the park was reclassified as a protected landscape. The park was reestablished as Quezon Protected Landscape on June 2, 2003, by Proclamation No. 394, with a smaller area of 938 hectares (2,320 acres).

== Park features ==
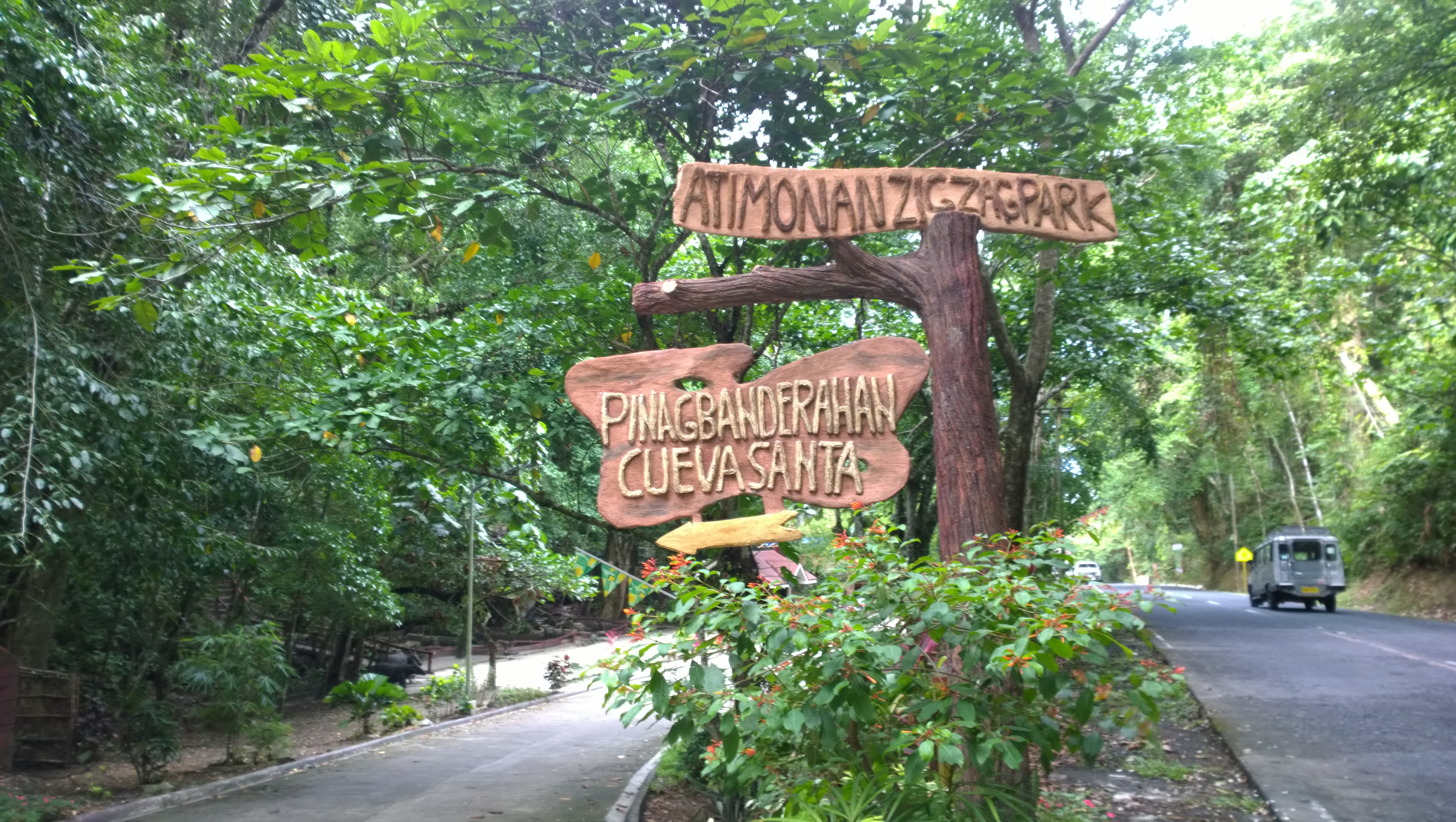
Atimonan Zigzag Park at the Quezon Protected Landscape

Quezon Protected Landscape is situated in the southern Sierra Madre mountain range on Luzon island. The landscape is lowland rainforest with karst landscape and vegetation. Activities in the park include bird watching, hiking to Mount Mirador (See below), trekking to view the flora and fauna, or trekking to the 80-metre (260 ft) Bantakay Falls in Brgy. Sta. Catalina. There are least five waterfalls in the park with Bantakay, the most accessible. Near the falls is Bantakay Caves which is open for exploring. Some of the other caves in the park include Cueva Santa and Nilubugan Cave.

Inside the park are several areas cleared for camping with Niyugan campsite as one of the preferred campsite.

== Fauna ==
The park is known for its virgin forest teeming with numerous wildlife, with several species endemic to the Philippines. Some of the species in the park are the monitor lizard, monkey, deer, wild pig, parrot, dove, pigeon, jungle fowl (manok labuyo), yellow bittern, cinnamon bittern, buff-banded rail, barred rail, white-browed crake, marsh sandpiper, long-toed stint, Swinhoe's snipe, striated grassbird, rufous hornbill, Luzon hornbill, pink-bellied imperial pigeon, guaiabero, colasisi, blackish cuckooshrike, flaming sunbird and flowerpecker.

In April 2010, the Northern Sierra Madre Forest monitor lizard Varanus bitatawa (local name: butikaw) was discovered by the western world. The lizard has long been known to the Aeta and Ilongot indigenous peoples who have used it as a food source.

== Historical significance ==
The highest point of the park at 366 m (1,201 ft) is Mount Mirador. During the Philippine Revolution, the Philippine flag was raised on the mountain signifying the conquest of the region. The American and Japanese flags were also hoisted on the mountain during their colonization, and in 1946 when the Philippine flag was raised there again after the country gained independence. Also called Mount Pinagbanderahan, literally meaning "where the flag was hoisted", the mountain is easily accessible via stairway, which takes about an hour or so to climb. The summit is a vantage point for viewing nearby mountains like Mount Banahaw, the island provinces of Marinduque or Mindoro and the major towns of Quezon.

== Accessibility ==
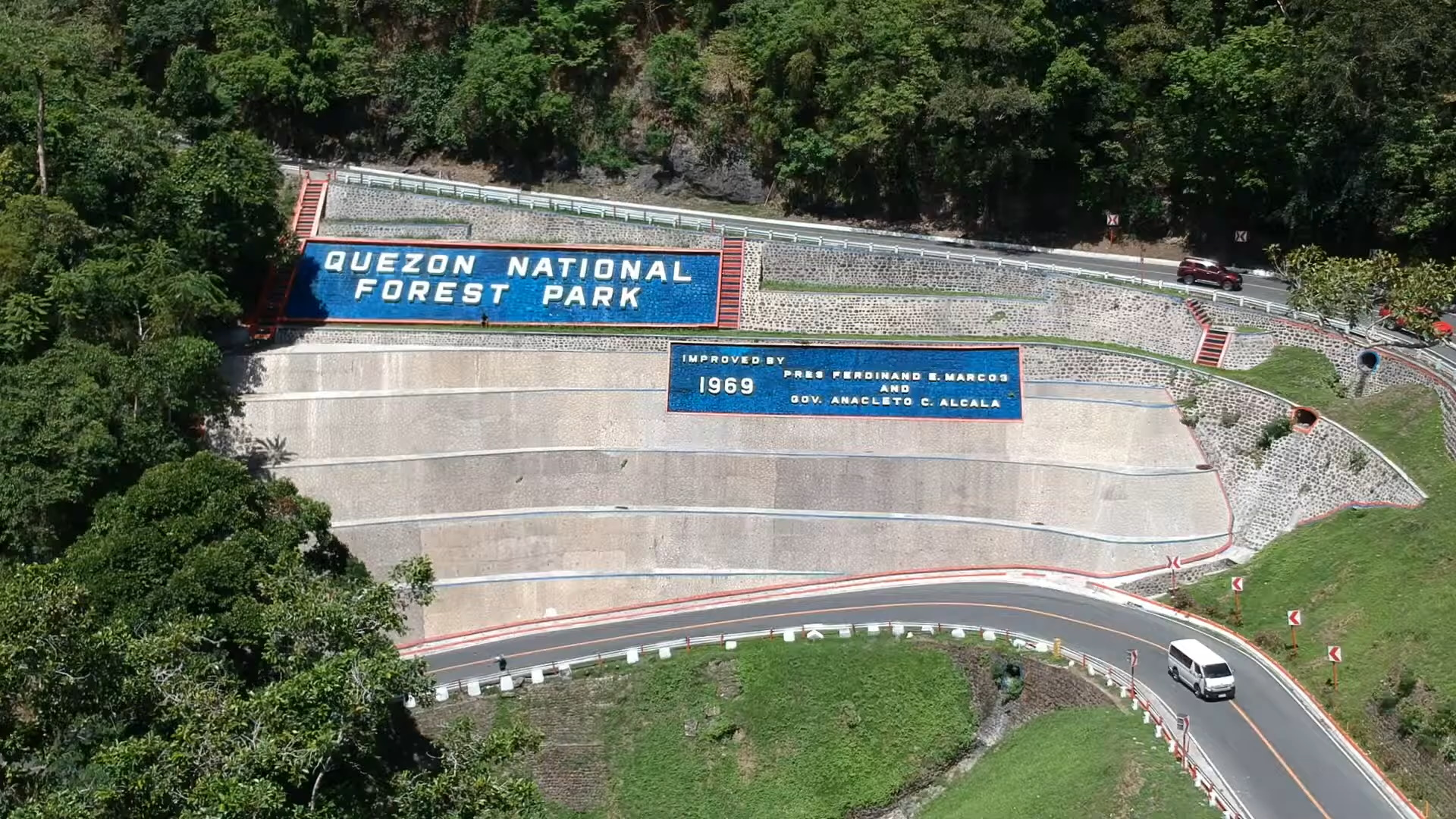
Pagbilao Zigzag Road

The park is located about 164 kilometres (102 mi) southeast of Manila, the capital of the Philippines and main gateway to the country. The protected landscape is easily accessible via the Pan-Philippine Highway, the national highway that connects the whole country, which traverses the middle of the park. The road that cuts through the park includes a zigzag section (also known to the locals as "EME”, due to mispronounced name of Imee Marcos which was written on the side of the mountain.) It was a project of former Governor Alcala and the late former Pres. Ferdinand Marcos. It is open only to light vehicles, two wheels up to six wheels only as it is prone to accidents due to dangerous hairpin curves.

“Bitukang Manok" is located in Basud, Camarines Norte. A longer diversion road bypasses that part of the road.

== See also ==
- List of protected areas of the Philippines
- Ecoregions in the Philippines
