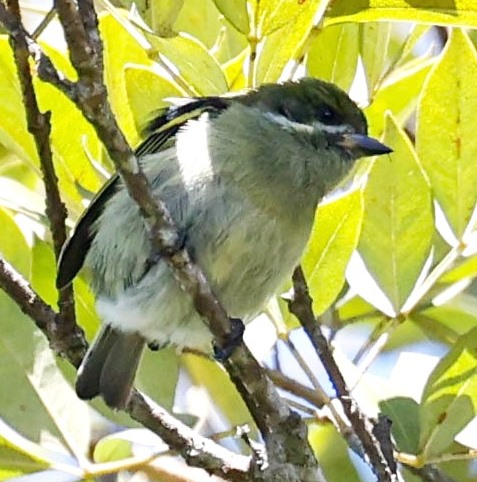
- In Udzungwa Mountains, Tanzania

Conservation status
- Least Concern (IUCN 3.1)

Scientific classification
- Kingdom: Animalia
- Phylum: Chordata
- Class: Aves
- Order: Piciformes
- Family: Lybiidae
- Genus: Pogoniulus
- Species: P. leucomystax

Binomial name
- Pogoniulus leucomystax (Sharpe, 1892)

= Moustached tinkerbird =

Species of bird

The moustached tinkerbird (Pogoniulus leucomystax) is a species of bird in the large Piciformes order in the Lybiidae family. It occurs in high-altitude forests in central Africa. It is greenish with little sexual dimorphism. The tinkerbird eats berries and insects.

== Taxonomy ==
=== Previous classification ===
Older literature often separate the moustached tinkerbird and its close relative, the green tinkerbird, (Pogoniulus simplex) from the rest of Pogoniulus into a separate now-defunct genus, Viridibucco (Oberholser, 1905). "Viridibucco leucomystax" is a commonly encountered taxonomical synonym of the current valid name Pogoniulus leucomystax. The split was supported by their shared overall green coloration and similar lifestyle. In the early 20th century, the two were even considered conspecific.

=== Evolutionary history ===
Some also speculate that the moustached tinkerbird, the green tinkerbird and the western tinkerbird (Pogoniulus coryphaea) are allospecies.

=== Subspecies ===
On basis of morphological differences, Ripley and Heinrich described a tentative subspecies of Pogoniulus leucomystax. The type specimen of Pogoniulus leucomystax meridionalis (Ripley and Heinrich, 1969) originated from the Mdando Forest in the Njombe region in southwestern Tanzania. Pogoniulus leucomystax meridionalis distinguishes itself by its darker and greyer underside. Particularly, the belly and flank have little to no olive-green coloration. The aforementioned conclusion was drawn through the observation of three paratypes of meridionalis which were then compared to seventeen paratypes of leucomystax. At the time, the subspecies' documented range matched that of the type-locality.

The validity of Pogoniulus leucomystax meridionalis remains up for debate. An independent study compared variation in color across Kenya, Tanzania, Zambia, and Malawi where no clear cline was observed. Furthermore, the three paratypes used to describe Pogoniulus leucomystax meridionalis were collected in October. The moustached tinkerbird molts between February and June, the greyer plumage may be attributed to wear and sun damage. Other African green picids are known to progressively grey as feathers wear. North to south along the moustached tinkerbird's distribution, a cline of increasing wing length have some believe the southern Pogoniulus leucomystax meridionalis could be a valid taxa. Disagreeing literature press the cline does not merit the creation of a separate subspecies.

== Description ==
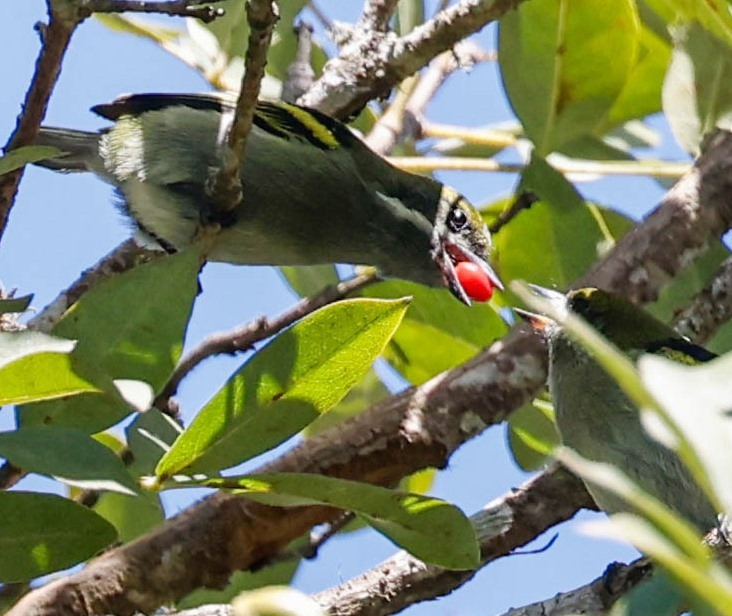
In Udzungwa Mountains, Tanzania

The moustached tinkerbird has mostly a yellow-tinged-green color, a paler belly, and darker undersides. Feathers on the upper lores, ear covert, and the sides of the neck are grey with green tips giving a more olive-grey appearance. From the corners of the bill, the characteristic white slash runs across the lower lores and lines the undereye. From there, it continues down each side of the neck where it broadens and abruptly ends. The blackish sides contrast with the yellow-green back and bright-yellow rump. Yellow-green lines the otherwise black tail feathers. The wings are black with green-yellow-lined inner primaries and secondaries. Yellow-tipped greater and middle coverts give the illusion of a broad yellow bar running across each wing. When in flight the mostly off-white underwings are visible. The moustached tinkerbird has black feet and a two-toned bill. The bill is off-white to yellow up to some place along the mid-bill where the color scheme shifts to grey or black.

Females typically resemble immature males, although, the species exhibit little sexual dimorphism. In immature males and females, the yellow patches on the rump and wings may not be as bright. The pale belly patch may also be larger, paler, and yellower. Young chicks have hypotarsal spiky scutes. They are small birds who weigh on average 11 grams (0.39 oz). Wingspan averages between 53 and 59 millimetres (2.1 and 2.3 in).

== Behavior ==
=== Vocalization ===
Both sexes become very vocal during the breeding season. The moustached tinkerbird usually sings when concealed by dense vegetation. Occasionally, they will vocalize out in the open atop a perch. The moustached tinkerbird has two common call patterns. The moustached tinkerbird may discharge a singular trill that is often slower at onset: "pi-pi-pi-pi-i-i-i-i-i-i-i-i-i-i-i". A variation follows a ternary form: "pi-pi-pi-pi-i-i-i-i-i-i-pi-pi-pi-pi". Trills last no more than a few seconds. The moustached tinkerbird may also discharge its calls in series punctuated by pauses. In between each pause, a vocalizing bird will either repeat a set number of notes or alternate in-between sets. Regular series often contain six notes: "pi-pi-pi-pi-pi-pi---pi-pi-pi-pi-pi-pi---pi-pi-pi-pi-pi-pi...." Irregular series contain either three, seven, six, nine, or five notes: "pi-pi-pi---pi-pi-pi-pi-pi---pi-pi-pi....".

The moustached tinkerbird responds to rivals with varied strings of vocalization. Rivals will also chitter when aggressively chasing one another through the trees.

From the nest, chicks emit regular "ti-ti-ti-ti" calls. Parents chatter when entering the roosting cavity prompting their young to beg with "peep-peep-peep" vocalizations.

=== Diet ===
The moustached tinkerbird is a frugivorous specialist of mistletoe in the Loranthaceae and Viscaceae families, although it readily preys on insects. When feeding on mistletoe fruits, it has been seen removing the indigest exocarps of some fruits before swallowing the small berries whole. Within a few minutes following ingestion, the bird regurgitates viscin-covered mistletoe seeds. The sticky substance lands onto neighboring branches often near the source plant. Mistletoe seeds germinate in the 1–2 following days. The moustached tinkerbird is an important close range disseminator of the mistletoe species it consumes. Most other frugivorous birds deliberately omit mistletoe berries from their diet. The moustached tinkerbird is often the sole user of the resource, thus, reducing competition. Although many other species of the Pogoniulus genus, such as Pogoniulus chrysoconus and Pogoniulus bilineatus, are documented to have a comparable affinity for mistletoe species.

=== Reproduction ===
The moustached tinkerbird is hole-nesting species. Parents dig out the nest cavity in dead trees. Nest entrance averages 2 centimetres (0.79 in) in diameter. The entrance's small size protects the vulnerable young from mammalian predators. Parents average 1–2 eggs per brood and are quite successful: all chicks often fledge. Females typically lay sometime between September and November, rarely in December. Early layers sometimes attempt a second clutch in December once the chicks fledge. A single nesting period lasts around 33 days with a two-month interval in-between clutches. During the breeding season, parents feed chicks insects and mistletoe berries. Chicks regurgitate mistletoe seeds and parents typically carry them away keeping the space clean. Often, dry seeds gather on the rim of the nest-hole in conspicuous rings.

=== Predation ===
Suspected predators of the moustached tinkerbird include members of Viverridae and Mustelidae. The Great Lakes bush viper, Atheris nitschei, is one of the few forest dwelling snakes large enough to pose a threat to this African barbet.

== Habitat and distribution ==
The moustached tinkerbird's range covers Kenya, Malawi, Tanzania, Uganda, and Zambia where it is resident. It inhabits high-altitude evergreen forests usually between 900 and 2,500 metres (3,000 and 8,200 ft) above sea level, although it may also be found upwards of 3,000 metres (9,800 ft). Some individuals also dwell in the lower parts of the Usambra mountain range at an altitude of 450 metres (1,480 ft). The moustached tinkerbird primarily frequent the dense interior of secondary growth forests. While the moustached tinkerbird is non-migratory, some occasionally wander away from established populations to small forest patches 30–40 kilometres (19–25 mi) away.

As a specialist species, it relies almost entirely on the berries to sustain itself. Suitable habitats must be home to 4–6 mistletoe species to efficiently provide the moustached tinkerbird mistletoe fruit year-round.
