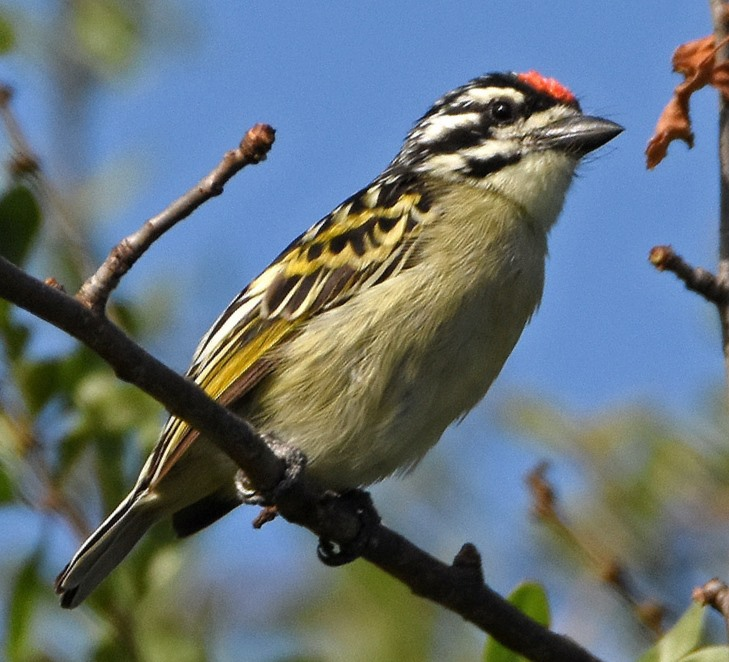
- P. uropygialis in Ethiopia

Scientific classification
- Kingdom: Animalia
- Phylum: Chordata
- Class: Aves
- Order: Piciformes
- Family: Lybiidae
- Genus: Pogoniulus
- Species: P. uropygialis

Binomial name
- Pogoniulus uropygialis (Heuglin, 1862)

= Northern red-fronted tinkerbird =

Species of bird

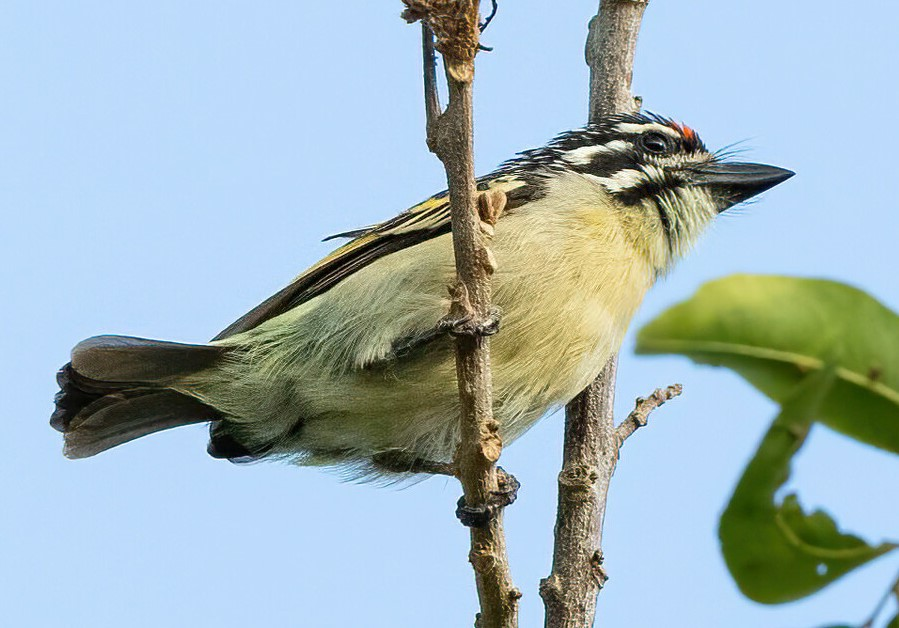
P. uropygialis in coastal Kenya

The northern red-fronted tinkerbird (Pogoniulus uropygialis) is a small bird in the African barbet family Lybiidae that is found in East Africa. It was regarded as conspecific with the southern red-fronted tinkerbird.

== Taxonomy ==
The northern red-fronted tinkerbird was formally described in 1862 by the German explorer and ornithologist Theodor von Heuglin based on specimens collected in the Ain Saba region (Anseba) of northern Eritrea. He coined the binomial name Barbatula uropygialis where the specific epithet is Medieval Latin meaning "rump". The northern red-fronted tinkerbird is now one of 10 tinkerbirds placed in the genus Pogoniulus that was introduced in 1842 by Frédéric de Lafresnaye. The species was formerly treated as conspecific with the southern red-fronted tinkerbird that has a disjunct distribution in southern Africa. The species were split based on the phenotypic differences as well as the results from a molecular phylogenetic study published in 2021.

Two subspecies are recognised:

- Pogoniulus uropygialis uropygialis (Heuglin, 1862) – Eritrea to central Ethiopia and north Somalia
- Pogoniulus uropygialis affinis (Reichenow, 1879) – southeast Sudan to south Somalia south to Uganda and southeast Tanzania.

== Description ==
It is a strikingly marked bird, characterized by a red patch above the bill in adult males. Adult birds are distinguished from the Yellow-fronted Tinkerbird by their bright red frontal coloration. While identification of immatures can be challenging, they can be differentiated from those of the Northern Red-fronted Tinkerbird by their slightly smaller size and darker back coloration.

Its vocal repertoire includes a monotonous, repetitious "took" call, often delivered in long series, as well as a higher-pitched, two- or three-part call and a rapid trill.

== Habitat ==
It occupies various habitats dry woodland, bushland, riverine bush in desert, scrubland, cut-over forest and gardens.
