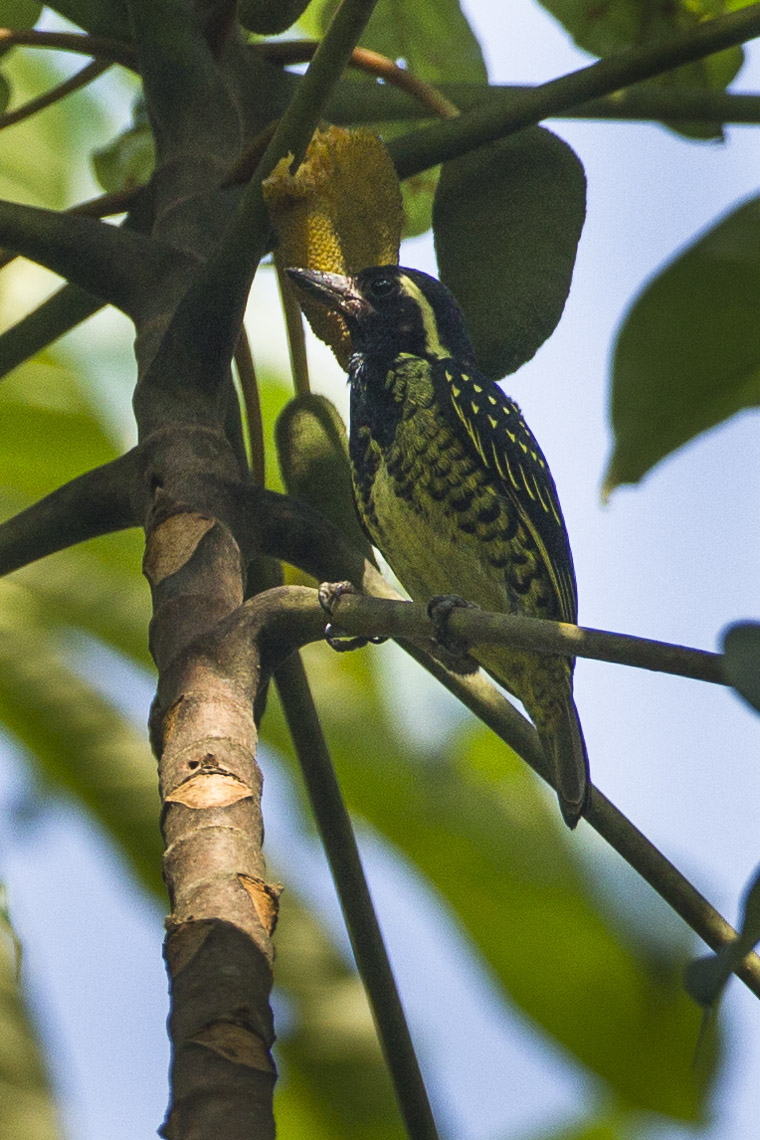

Conservation status
- Least Concern (IUCN 3.1)

Scientific classification
- Kingdom: Animalia
- Phylum: Chordata
- Class: Aves
- Order: Piciformes
- Family: Lybiidae
- Genus: Buccanodon; G.R. Gray, 1855
- Species: B. duchaillui

Binomial name
- Buccanodon duchaillui (Cassin, 1855)

= Yellow-spotted barbet =

Species of bird

The yellow-spotted barbet (Buccanodon duchaillui) is a bird species in the monotypic genus Buccanodon. It belongs to the African barbet family (Lybiidae) which was formerly included in the Capitonidae and sometimes in the Ramphastidae.

Two subspecies are known:

- B. d. duchailllui (Cassin, 1856) (eastern yellow-spotted barbet) - eastern and central Africa, west to Nigeria
- B. d. dowsetti Boesman & Collar, 2019 (western yellow-spotted barbet) - Sierra Leone to Togo

The western subspecies was described in 2019 as a distinct species based on its unique song. The western yellow-spotted barbet has a song described by Nigel James Collar and Peter Boesman as "a series of 7–10 accelerating notes similar to a song of hairy-breasted barbet (Tricholaema hirsuta)" (phoneticized as "oop"), while the eastern yellow-spotted barbet has a song described by Collar and Boesman as a "characteristic purring (lasting 1–2 seconds), unique among [African] barbets" (phoneticized as "rrurrrrrr…"). These song differences led to the description of B. dowsetti as a distinct species. In 2023, the International Ornithological Congress recognized dowsetti as a distinct taxon, but tentatively kept it as a subspecies of duchailllui due to other studies finding significant divergences elsewhere within the species' range, indicating that B. duchaillui as a whole may represent a species complex.

It is found in Angola, Cameroon, Central African Republic, Republic of the Congo, Democratic Republic of the Congo, Ivory Coast, Equatorial Guinea, Gabon, Ghana, Guinea, Kenya, Liberia, Nigeria, Sierra Leone, Tanzania, and Uganda.
