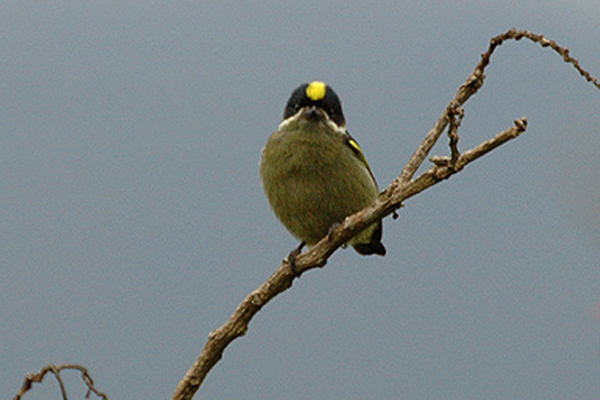
- Western tinkerbird (P. coryphaea) in Mgahinga National Park, Uganda

Scientific classification
- Kingdom: Animalia
- Phylum: Chordata
- Class: Aves
- Order: Piciformes
- Family: Lybiidae
- Genus: Pogoniulus; Lafresnaye, 1842

Type species
- Bucco pusillus Dumont, 1805

Audio
- Call of yellow-fronted tinkerbird (P. chrysoconus) in South Africa

= Tinkerbird =

Tinkerbirds

Genus of birds

The tinkerbirds or tinker barbets are the genus Pogoniulus in the African barbet family Lybiidae. The genus was formerly included in the family Capitonidae and sometimes in the family Ramphastidae. Tinkerbirds are widely distributed in tropical Africa.

== Taxonomy ==
The genus Pogoniulus was introduced in 1842 by the French ornithologist Frédéric de Lafresnaye with "Le Barbion mâle" Levaillant, that is Bucco pusillus Dumont, 1805, as the type species, now the southern red-fronted tinkerbird. The genus name is a diminutive of the name Pogonias that had been introduced in 1811 by Johann Karl Wilhelm Illiger. Pogonias is from the Ancient Greek πωγωνιας/pōgōnias meaning "bearded".

The genus contains 10 species:

Image	Common name	Scientific name	Distribution
	Speckled tinkerbird	Pogoniulus scolopaceus	Angola, Benin, Cameroon, Central African Republic, Republic of the Congo, Democratic Republic of the Congo, Ivory Coast, Equatorial Guinea, Gabon, Ghana, Guinea, Kenya, Liberia, Nigeria, Sierra Leone, Togo, and Uganda.
	Green tinkerbird	Pogoniulus simplex	Kenya, Malawi, Mozambique, and Tanzania.
	Moustached tinkerbird	Pogoniulus leucomystax	Kenya, Malawi, Tanzania, Uganda, and Zambia.
	Western tinkerbird	Pogoniulus coryphaea	Angola, Cameroon, Democratic Republic of the Congo, Nigeria, Rwanda, and Uganda.
	Red-rumped tinkerbird	Pogoniulus atroflavus	Angola, Cameroon, Central African Republic, Republic of the Congo, Democratic Republic of the Congo, Ivory Coast, Equatorial Guinea, Gabon, Ghana, Guinea, Liberia, Mali, Nigeria, Senegal, Sierra Leone, and Uganda.
	Yellow-throated tinkerbird	Pogoniulus subsulphureus	Angola, Benin, Cameroon, Central African Republic, Republic of the Congo, Democratic Republic of the Congo, Ivory Coast, Equatorial Guinea, Gabon, Ghana, Guinea, Liberia, Mali, Nigeria, Sierra Leone, and Uganda.
	Yellow-rumped tinkerbird	Pogoniulus bilineatus	Angola, Benin, Burundi, Cameroon, Central African Republic, Republic of the Congo, Democratic Republic of the Congo, Ivory Coast, Equatorial Guinea, Eswatini, Gabon, Gambia, Ghana, Guinea, Guinea-Bissau, Kenya, Liberia, Malawi, Mozambique, Nigeria, Rwanda, Senegal, Sierra Leone, South Africa, South Sudan, Tanzania, Togo, Uganda, Zambia, and Zimbabwe.
	Northern red-fronted tinkerbird	Pogoniulus uropygialis	Eritrea, Ethiopia and Somalia to southeast Sudan, Uganda and southeast Tanzania
	Southern red-fronted tinkerbird	Pogoniulus pusillus	Southern Mozambique and eastern South Africa
	Yellow-fronted tinkerbird	Pogoniulus chrysoconus	Africa south of the Sahara Desert

Supposed fossil remains of Late Miocene tinkerbirds were found at Kohfidisch (Austria) but are not yet thoroughly studied. It is not clear whether they belong to an extant genus, but given the late date this may well be so.
