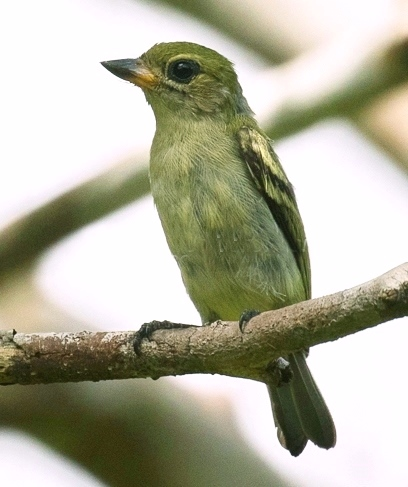

Conservation status
- Least Concern (IUCN 3.1)

Scientific classification
- Kingdom: Animalia
- Phylum: Chordata
- Class: Aves
- Order: Piciformes
- Family: Lybiidae
- Genus: Pogoniulus
- Species: P. simplex

Binomial name
- Pogoniulus simplex (Fischer, GA & Reichenow, 1884)

= Green tinkerbird =

Species of bird

The green tinkerbird (Pogoniulus simplex) is a species of bird in the African barbet family Lybiidae. It is found in East Africa (Kenya, Malawi, Mozambique, and Tanzania).

== Taxonomy and etymology ==
The genus name Pogoniulus is a diminutive of the name Pogonias that had been introduced in 1811 by Johann Karl Wilhelm Illiger. Pogonias is from the Ancient Greek πωγωνιας/pōgōnias meaning "bearded". The specific simplex is from latin, meaning "simple", "plain".

Alternative English names for this species include "Eastern Green Tinkerbird," "Green Tinker Barbet," and "African Green Tinkerbird." In historical literature, it has been previously referred to as the "Little Green Barbet."

This species is monotypic.

== Description ==
The Green Tinkerbird is a diminutive (approximately 11.5 cm, 8.8 g) and active olive-green barbet characterized by a lack of obvious facial markings, a short, two-toned bill with a black tip and yellow base, a conspicuous bright yellow rump, and two distinct yellow wing bars. In the field, this species exhibits a predominantly olive-green appearance with a paler gray-olive underside. The short, dagger-shaped bill is a key feature, along with the striking yellow rump that is often puffed up during vocalizations.

This species closely resembles the Moustached tinkerbird, however, their ranges overlap only slightly, and they can be distinguished by the Green Tinkerbird's lack of facial markings.

It is typically detected by its vocalizations, which include accelerating trilled phrases that may be repeated for extended periods. It also produces a slower series of tooting notes.

== Ecology ==
=== Distribution ===
The geographical distribution of the Green Tinkerbird is discontinuous. It is found along the East African coastal plain, inhabiting the foothills of the Eastern Arc Mountains and the Great Rift Valley. This range extends from Kenya in the north to Mozambique in the south, with a westward occurrence in Malawi east of the Rift Valley. It also occurs in the island of Zanzibar.

=== Habitat ===
It inhabits a variety of forest and thicket habitats across East Africa, ranging from coastal rag thickets at sea level to mid- and Afromontane forests up to 1,700 meters in elevation. It exhibits a preference for dense, tangled understories within these habitats, often found in secondary forests and degraded remnants. While generally forest-dependent, it may occasionally venture into adjacent open woodlands.

=== Breeding ===
Very little is known about the species' breeding habits, as only two nests have been documented. During a birding trip with Reach Africa Safaris on 3–4 March 2014 in the Boniane-Unguana area of Mozambique, 12 birders observed and photographed a Green Tinkerbird at what appeared to be its nest, marking only the third confirmed sighting of this species in southern Africa and the first documentation of its nesting behavior. The nest, located 1.6 meters off the ground in a dense thicket, was decorated with mistletoe fruit and seeds. The observation revealed that only one bird seemed to attend the nest, incubating for approximately 20 minutes before foraging. Upon returning, the bird made a distinct call, different from its usual vocalizations.

== Status ==
This species is evaluated as "Least Concern" on the IUCN Red List due to its large range, which does not meet the criteria for vulnerability based on range size. While the population trend appears to be decreasing, the decline is not considered rapid enough to warrant a vulnerable status. Although the population size is unknown, it is not believed to approach the thresholds for vulnerability.
