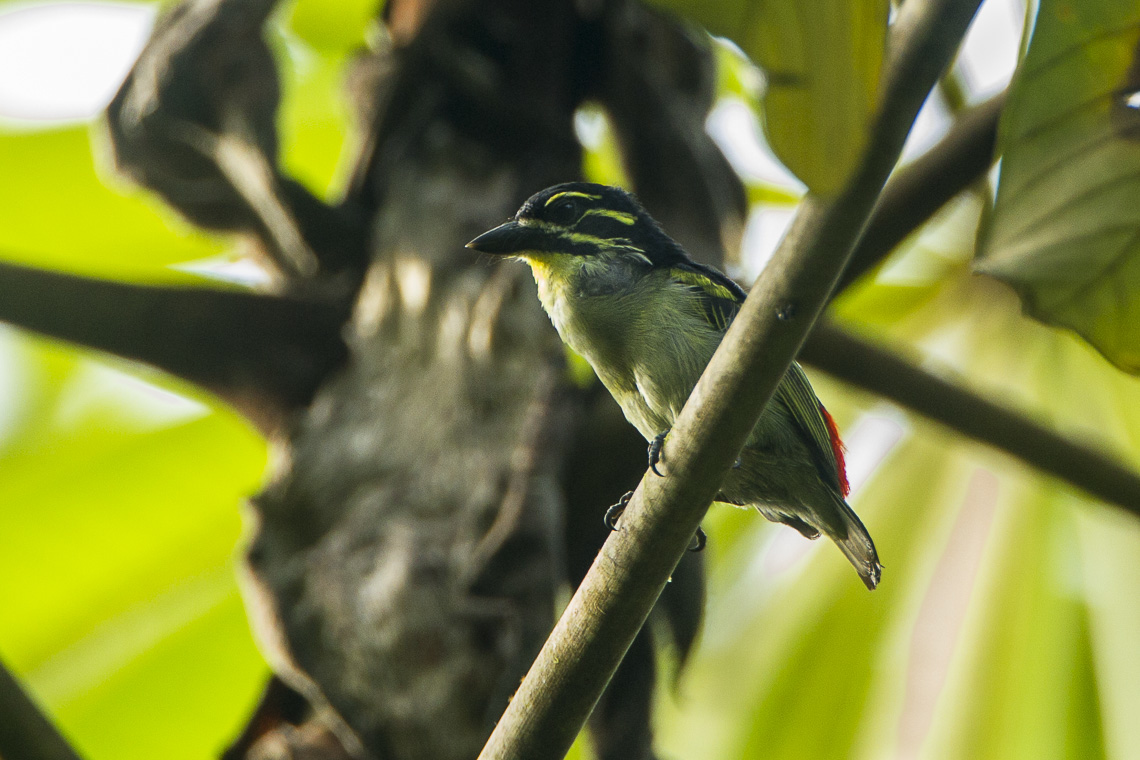

Conservation status
- Least Concern (IUCN 3.1)

Scientific classification
- Kingdom: Animalia
- Phylum: Chordata
- Class: Aves
- Order: Piciformes
- Family: Lybiidae
- Genus: Pogoniulus
- Species: P. atroflavus

Binomial name
- Pogoniulus atroflavus (Sparrman, 1798)

= Red-rumped tinkerbird =

Species of bird

The red-rumped tinkerbird (Pogoniulus atroflavus) is a small bird species in the Lybiidae family. It is widely distributed across the tropical rainforests of mid-western Africa. This species is monotypic, with no recognized subspecies. Measuring approximately 12–13 cm in length and weighing 14–21.5 g, the Red-rumped Tinkerbird is noted for its distinct coloration—a yellow chest, black head and back, and red lower back or rump that gives the species its name. The wings are black with yellow-tipped feathers, and younger birds tend to display duller plumage with a yellowish bill.

== Taxonomy and Related Species ==
The species is closely related to other members of the genus Pogoniulus, including P. bilineatus, P. pusillus, and P. chrysoconus.

== Habitat and Distribution ==
The Red-rumped Tinkerbird lives in mangrove forests, forest clearings, plantations, and grasslands. Red Rumped birds are typically found at elevations below 800 m, however in certain parts of West Africa, they can be found at up to 1,550 m of elevation. The species is distributed throughout mid-west Africa, where it occupies tropical and subtropical forested regions, and is lower rank on the food chain.

== Behavior and Ecology ==
=== Movement ===
The species is sedentary, exhibiting no seasonal migration.

=== Diet ===
The Red-rumped tinkerbirds diet consists mainly of fruits, figs and species of Allophylus and Loranthus, as well as insects and spiders. The Red-rumped tinkerbird can be found at all levels of the forest but is most active in the canopy. They can also be found foraging on the lower branches of trees.

==== Vocalizations ====
The species is known for its distinctive calls, which include an unbroken series of “pop” notes delivered at approximately 1.3 per second, rapid “bdddddt” trills lasting 3–4 seconds with around 29 notes per second, and shorter, higher-pitched trills at about 16 notes per second.

===== Breeding =====
Breeding periods vary across its range: from November to May and August in West Africa, May to June in the Central African Republic, and June to February in Uganda.

== Conservation status ==
The Red-rumped Tinkerbird is currently categorized as under the Least Concern category for endangerment according to the IUCN Red List, with an estimated global population of approximately 300,000 individuals. Although the population trend is considered decreasing, there are no major conservation actions currently in place due to its relatively low risk of endangerment.
