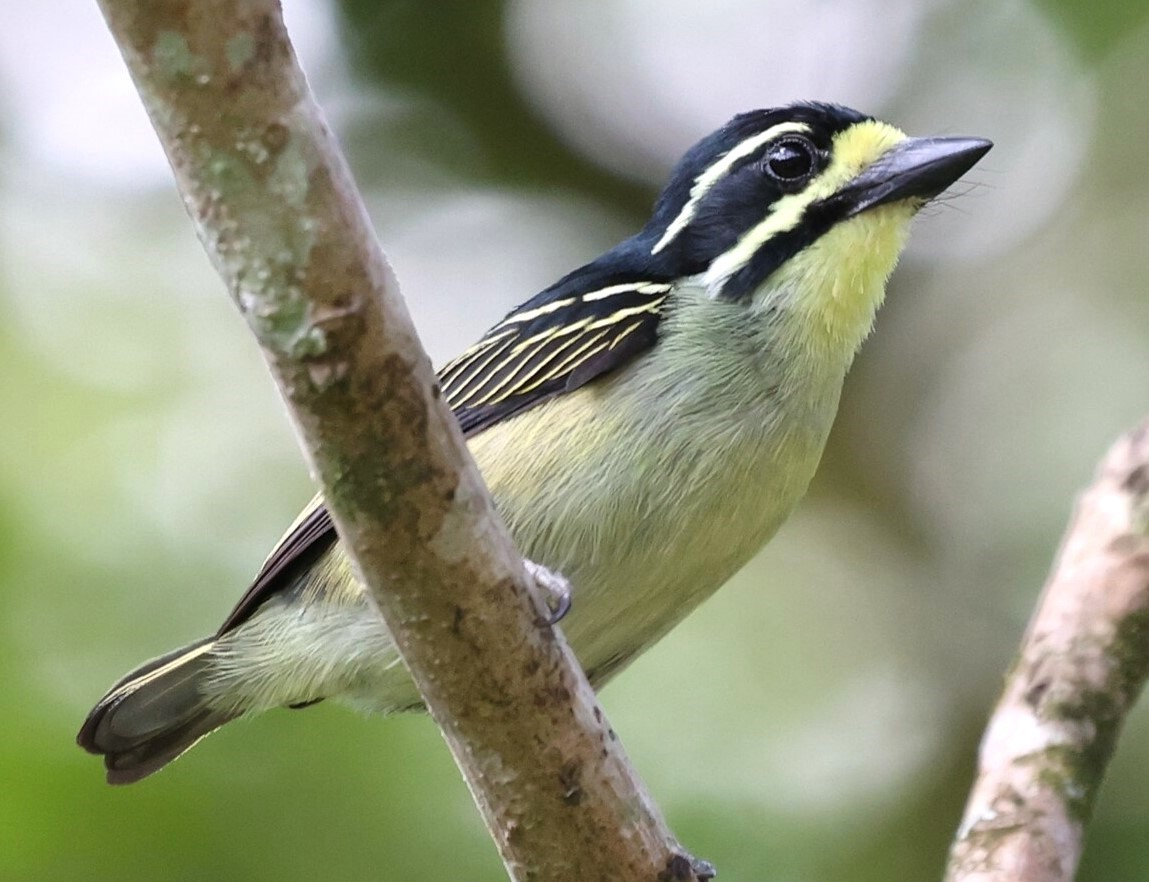

Conservation status
- Least Concern (IUCN 3.1)

Scientific classification
- Kingdom: Animalia
- Phylum: Chordata
- Class: Aves
- Order: Piciformes
- Family: Lybiidae
- Genus: Pogoniulus
- Species: P. subsulphureus

Binomial name
- Pogoniulus subsulphureus (Fraser, 1843)

Subspecies
- See text

Synonyms
- Barbatula chrysopyga

= Yellow-throated tinkerbird =

Species of bird

The yellow-throated tinkerbird (Pogoniulus subsulphureus) is a species of bird in the Lybiidae family (African barbets). They are small and sedentary, and typically forage in the higher canopy of primary or established secondary forest. Yellow-throated tinkerbirds located closer to the coast, as well as those in louder environments, have been found to make higher-pitched vocalizations.

== Range ==
It is found throughout the lowland intra-tropical rainforest of Sub-Saharan Africa.

== Subspecies ==
Three subspecies are recognized, of which the westernmost taxon has the deepest yellow and starkest black plumage.

- P. s. chrysopygus (Shelley, 1889) — Sierra Leone and southeastern Guinea eastward to southern Ghana
- P. s. flavimentum (J.Verreaux & E.Verreaux, 1851) — Togo eastward through Nigeria, Cameroon, Gabon, Central African Republic, Democratic Republic of the Congo and Uganda
- P. s. subsulphureus (Fraser, 1843) — limited to Bioko Island
