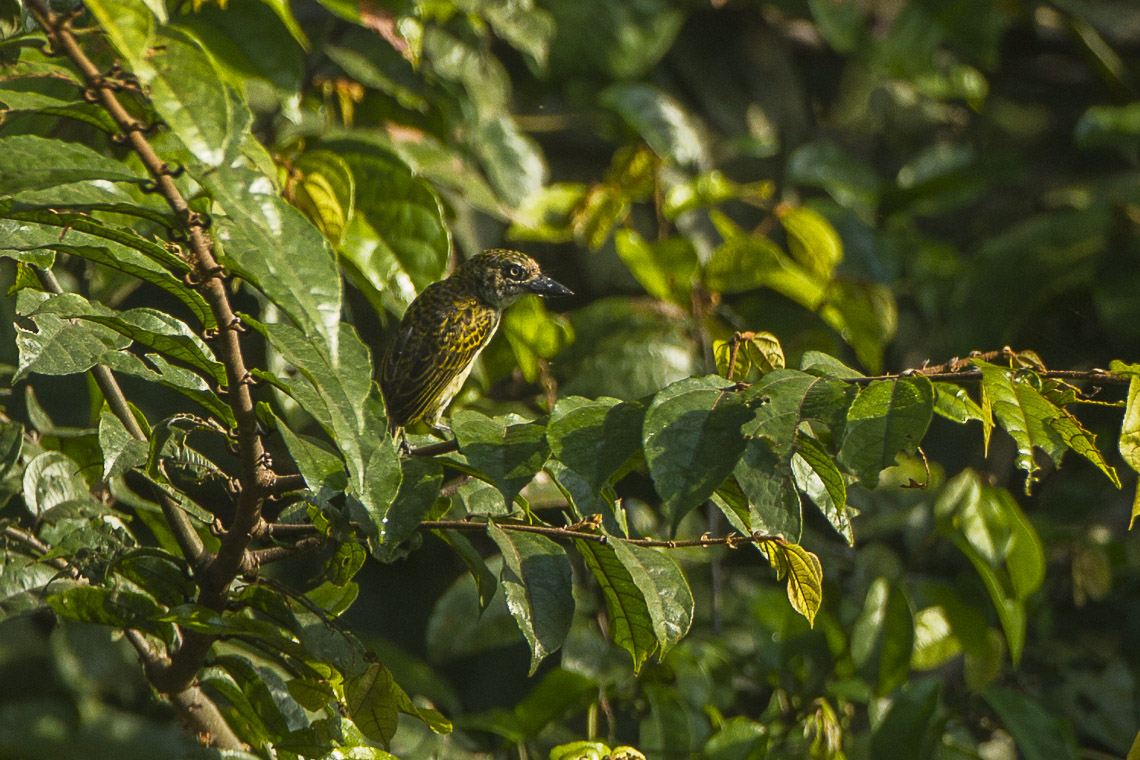

Conservation status
- Least Concern (IUCN 3.1)

Scientific classification
- Kingdom: Animalia
- Phylum: Chordata
- Class: Aves
- Order: Piciformes
- Family: Lybiidae
- Genus: Pogoniulus
- Species: P. scolopaceus

Binomial name
- Pogoniulus scolopaceus (Bonaparte, 1850)

Subspecies
- P. s. scolopaceus - (Bonaparte, 1850); P. s. stellatus - (Jardine & Fraser, 1852); P. s. flavisquamatus - (Verreaux, J & Verreaux, E, 1855)

= Speckled tinkerbird =

Species of bird

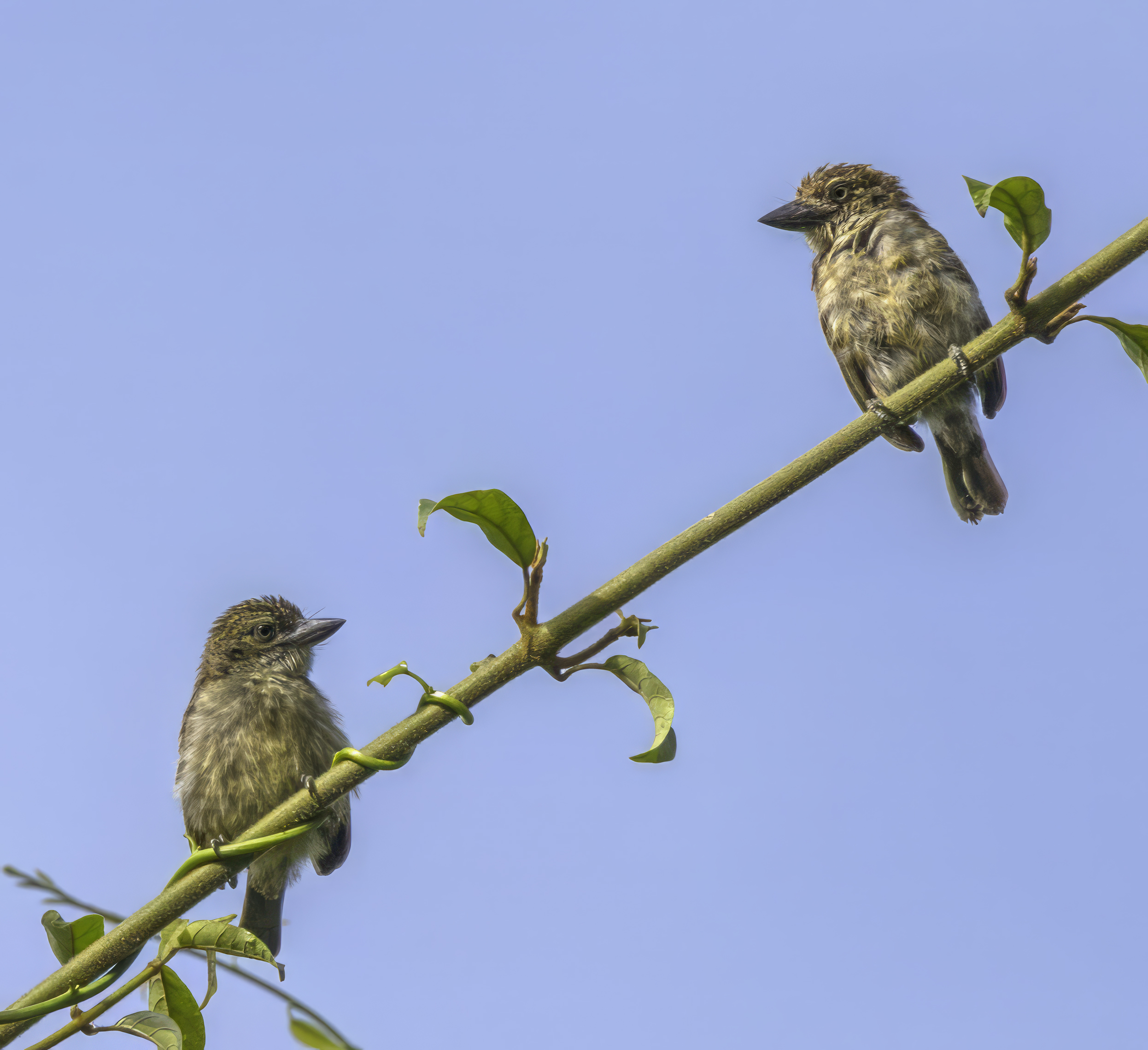
Nyamebe Bepo Forest Reserve, Ashanti Region, Ghana

The speckled tinkerbird (Pogoniulus scolopaceus) is a species of bird in the Lybiidae family (African barbets).

It is widespread across the African tropical rainforest.
