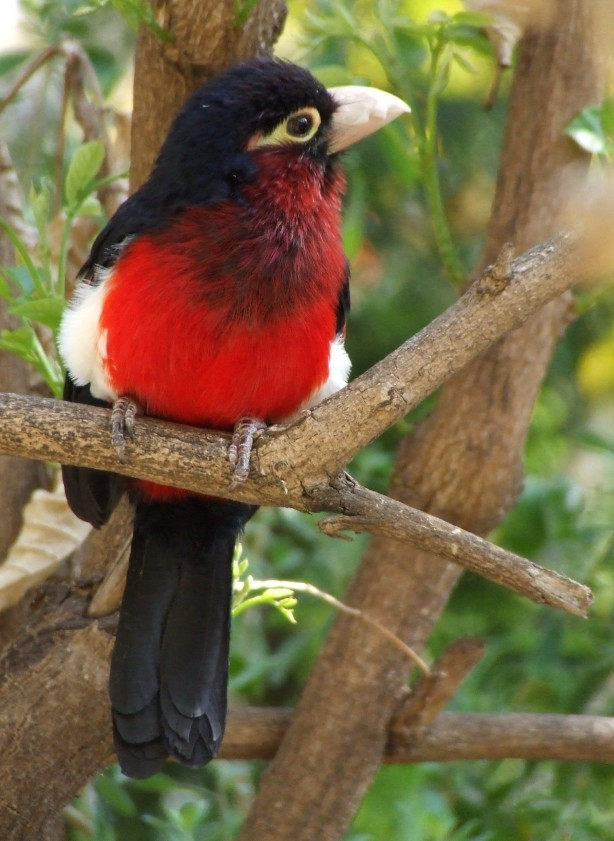
- Double-toothed barbet Lybius bidentatus

Scientific classification
- Kingdom: Animalia
- Phylum: Chordata
- Class: Aves
- Order: Piciformes
- Suborder: Pici
- Infraorder: Ramphastides
- Family: Lybiidae; Sibley & Ahlquist, 1985

Type genus
- Lybius Hermann, 1783

Genera
- Buccanodon; Gymnobucco; Lybius; Pogonornis; Pogoniulus; Stactolaema; Trachylaemus; Trachyphonus; Tricholaema

= Lybiidae =

Family of birds

Lybiidae is a family of birds also known as the African barbets. There are 44 species ranging from the type genus Lybius of forest interior to the tinkerbirds (Pogoniulus) of forest and scrubland. They are found throughout sub-Saharan Africa, with the exception of the far south-west of South Africa.

The African terrestrial barbets, Trachyphoninae, range from the southern Sahara to South Africa. Members of one genus, Trachyphonus, are the most open-country species of barbets. The subfamily Lybiinae contains the African arboreal barbets. There are 37 species of Lybiinae in 8 genera.

== Taxonomy ==
The phylogenetic relationship between the African barbets and the eight other families in the order Piciformes is shown in the cladogram below. The number of species in each family is taken from the AviList taxonomy.

- Piciformes
  - - Galbulidae – jacamars (18 species)
    - Bucconidae – puffbirds (37 species)
  - - - Indicatoridae – honeyguides (16 species)
      - Picidae – woodpeckers (237 species)
    - - Megalaimidae – Asian barbets (35 species)
      - - Lybiidae – African barbets (43 species)
        - - Capitonidae – New World barbets (15 species)
          - - Semnornithidae – toucan barbets (2 species)
            - Ramphastidae – toucans (37 species)

== Description and ecology ==
Most African barbets are about 20–25 cm (7.9–9.8 in) long, plump-looking, with large heads, and their heavy bill is fringed with bristles; the tinkerbirds are smaller, ranging down to the red-rumped tinkerbird (Pogoniulus atroflavus) at 7 g (0.25 oz) and 9 cm (3.5 in).

They are mainly solitary birds, eating insects and fruit. Figs and numerous other species of fruiting tree and bush are visited. An individual barbet may feed on as many as 60 different species in its range. They will also visit plantations and take cultivated fruit and vegetables. Fruit is eaten whole and indigestible material such as seed pits regurgitated later (often before singing). Regurgitation does not usually happen in the nest (as happens with toucans), although tinkerbirds do place sticky mistletoe seeds around the entrances of their nests, possibly to deter predators. Like other barbets, they are thought to be important agents in seed dispersal in tropical forests.

As well as taking fruit, African barbets also take arthropod prey, gleaned from the branches and trunks of trees. A wide range of insects are taken, including ants, cicadas, dragonflies, crickets, locusts, beetles, moths and mantids. Scorpions and centipedes are also taken, and a few species will take small vertebrates such as lizards, frogs and geckos.

The precise nesting details of many African barbets are not yet known, although peculiarly among the Piciformes, some sociable species will nest in riverbanks or termite nests. Like many members of their order, Piciformes, their nests are in holes bored into a tree, and they usually lay between 2 and 4 eggs (except for the yellow-breasted barbet which lays up to 6), incubated for 13–15 days. Nesting duties are shared by both parents.

There has been generally little interference by humans. Some of the species which require primary woodland are declining due to deforestation, occasionally to the benefit of close relatives. For example, the loss of highland woods in Kenya has seen the moustached tinkerbird almost disappear and the red-fronted tinkerbird expand its range.

== Systematics ==
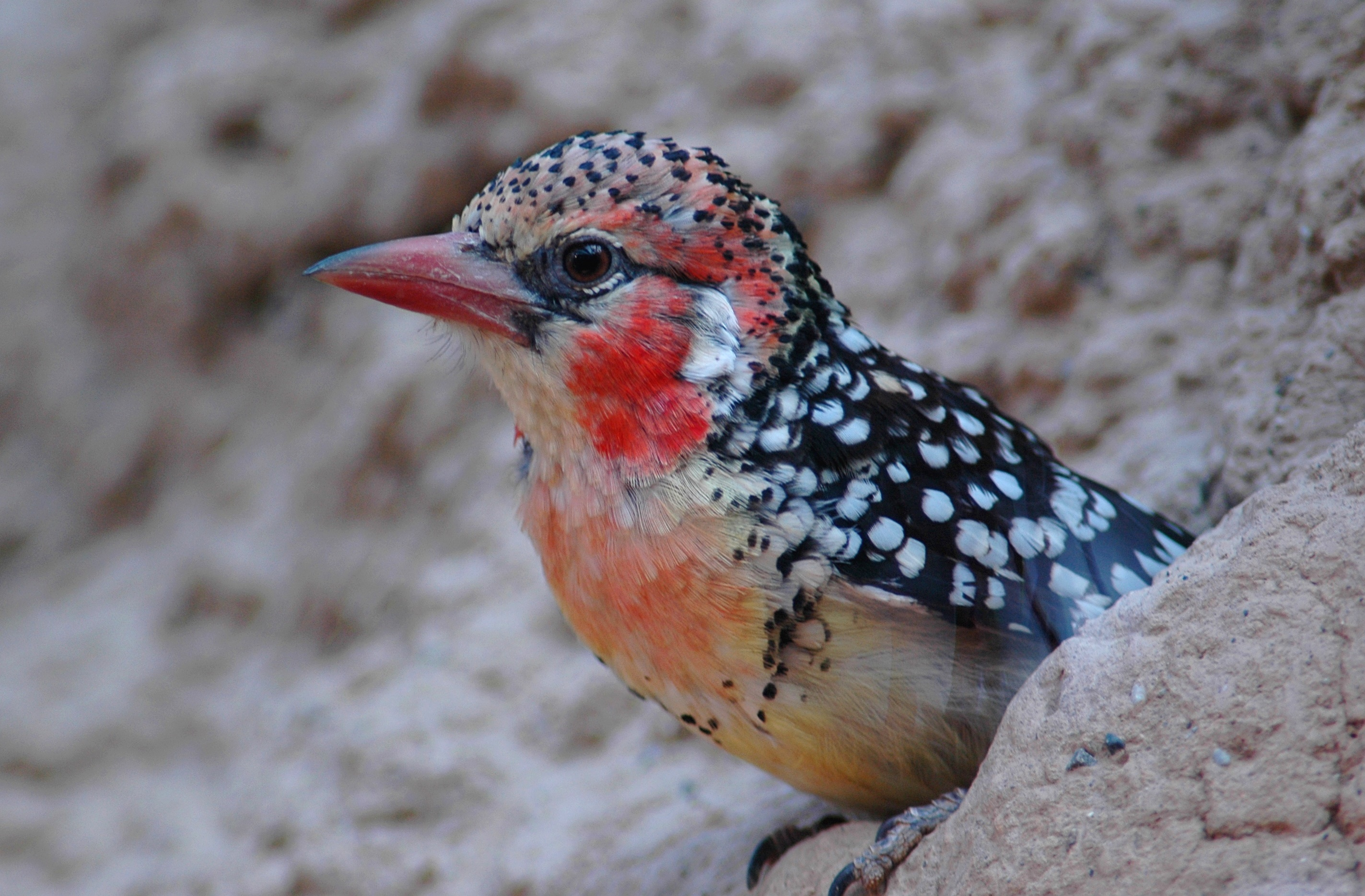
Red-and-yellow barbet Trachyphonus erythrocephalus

Subfamily Lybiinae

Image	Genus	Living Species
	Gymnobucco Bonaparte, 1850	Naked-faced barbet, Gymnobucco calvus; Bristle-nosed barbet, Gymnobucco peli; Sladen's barbet, Gymnobucco sladeni; Grey-throated barbet, Gymnobucco bonapartei
	Cryptolybia Clancey, 1979	Green barbet, Cryptolybia olivacea
	Stactolaema Marshall & Marshall, 1870	White-eared barbet, Stactolaema leucotis; Anchieta's barbet, Stactolaema anchietae; Whyte's barbet, Stactolaema whytii
	Pogoniulus Lafresnaye, 1842 – tinkerbirds	Speckled tinkerbird, Pogoniulus scolopaceus; Green tinkerbird, Pogoniulus simplex; Moustached tinkerbird, Pogoniulus leucomystax; Western tinkerbird, Pogoniulus coryphaea; Red-rumped tinkerbird, Pogoniulus atroflavus; Yellow-throated tinkerbird, Pogoniulus subsulphureus; Yellow-rumped tinkerbird, Pogoniulus bilineatus; Northern red-fronted tinkerbird, Pogoniulus uropygialis; Southern red-fronted tinkerbird, Pogoniulus pusillus; Yellow-fronted tinkerbird, Pogoniulus chrysoconus
	Buccanodon G.R. Gray, 1855	Yellow-spotted barbet, Buccanodon duchaillui
	Tricholaema Verreaux & Verreaux, 1855	Hairy-breasted barbet, Tricholaema hirsuta; Red-fronted barbet, Tricholaema diademata; Miombo pied barbet, Tricholaema frontata; Acacia pied barbet, Tricholaema leucomelas; Spot-flanked barbet, Tricholaema lacrymosa; Black-throated barbet, Tricholaema melanocephala
	Lybius Hermann, 1783	Banded barbet, Lybius undatus; Vieillot's barbet, Lybius vieilloti; White-headed barbet, Lybius leucocephalus; Chaplin's barbet or Zambian barbet, Lybius chaplini; Red-faced barbet, Lybius rubrifacies; Black-billed barbet, Lybius guifsobalito; Black-collared barbet, Lybius torquatus
	Pogonornis Billberg, 1828	Brown-breasted barbet, Pogonornis melanopterus; Black-backed barbet, Pogonornis minor; Double-toothed barbet, Pogonornis bidentatus; Bearded barbet, Pogonornis dubius; Black-breasted barbet, Pogonornis rolleti

Subfamily Trachyphoninae

Image	Genus	Living Species
	Trachylaemus Verreaux, J & Verreaux, É, 1851	Western yellow-billed barbet, Trachylaemus goffinii; Eastern yellow-billed barbet, Trachylaemus purpuratus
	Trachyphonus Ranzani, 1821	Crested barbet, Trachyphonus vaillantii; Yellow-breasted barbet, Trachyphonus margaritatus; Red-and-yellow barbet, Trachyphonus erythrocephalus; D'Arnaud's barbet, Trachyphonus darnaudii

It is not entirely resolved whether the Early to Middle Miocene genus Capitonides from Europe belongs to this family or the Asian barbets (now Megalaimidae). Indeed, given that the prehistoric birds somewhat resembled a primitive toucan (without these birds' present autapomorphies), they might occupy a more basal position among the barbet-toucan clade altogether. On the other hand, they show some similarities to Trachyphonus in particular and have even been placed into this genus, but this move is not widely accepted.

"CMC 152", a distal carpometacarpus similar to that of barbets and found at the Middle Miocene locality of Grive-Saint-Alban (France) was considered to differ from Capitonides in the initial description, being closer to extant (presumably Old World) barbets. This fossil is sometimes lumped into Trachyphonus too; in this case it may have more merit.

Supposed fossil remains of Late Miocene Pogoniulus were found at Kohfidisch (Austria) but are not yet thoroughly studied. It is not clear whether they belong to the extant genus but given the late date this may well be so.

== Sources cited ==
- Ballmann, Peter (1969): Les Oiseaux miocènes de la Grive-Saint-Alban (Isère) [The Miocene birds of Grive-Saint-Alban (Isère)]. Geobios 2: 157–204. [French with English abstract] doi:10.1016/S0016-6995(69)80005-7 (HTML abstract)
- Mlíkovský, Jirí (2002): Cenozoic Birds of the World, Part 1: Europe. Ninox Press, Prague. ISBN 80-901105-3-8 PDF fulltext
