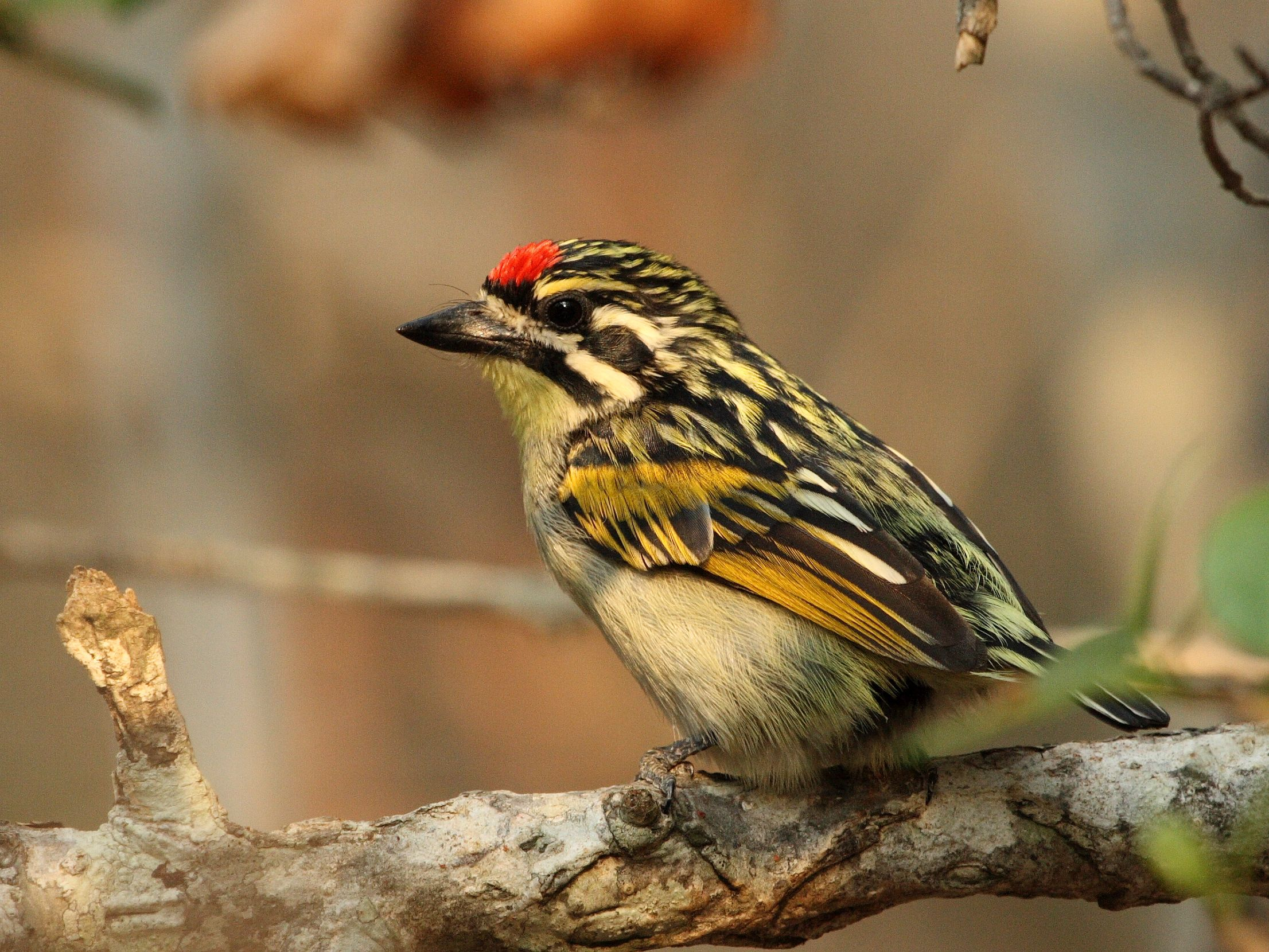

Conservation status
- Least Concern (IUCN 3.1)

Scientific classification
- Kingdom: Animalia
- Phylum: Chordata
- Class: Aves
- Order: Piciformes
- Family: Lybiidae
- Genus: Pogoniulus
- Species: P. pusillus

Binomial name
- Pogoniulus pusillus (Dumont, 1805)

= Southern red-fronted tinkerbird =

Species of bird

The southern red-fronted tinkerbird, (Pogoniulus pusillus) is a small bird in the African barbet family Lybiidae. It is found in southern Mozambique and eastern South Africa. This species was formerly regarded as conspecific with the northern red-fronted tinkerbird (Pogoniulus uropygialis).

The southern red-fronted tinkerbird is associated with juniper forest and scrub. It nests in a tree hole and lays two or three eggs. It eats berries and fruit, particularly mistletoe, but also takes insects as it forages in deep cover.

== Description ==
The southern red-fronted tinkerbird is 9–10.5 cm (3.5–4.1 in) in length. It is a plump bird, with a short neck, large head, and short tail. The adult has black upper parts heavily streaked with yellow and white, and a golden wing patch. Its head has a strong black and white pattern, with a red forecrown spot. Its underparts and rump are lemon yellow. Sexes are similar in appearance, but young birds lack the red forehead.

This species is distinguished from the yellow-fronted tinkerbird by the colour of the forehead spot, the golden wing patch, and its overall darker appearance. It is often confused with the red-fronted barbet, but it is significantly smaller than that species, has a black moustache and a less robust bill, and lacks a broad yellow superciliary stripe.

At about 101 repetitions per minute, the red-fronted tinkerbird's call is a fast tink-tink-tink-tink, very similar to that of the yellow-fronted tinkerbird. Many barbets perch prominently, but unlike their larger relatives, the smaller tinkerbirds sing from cover and are more frequently heard than seen.
