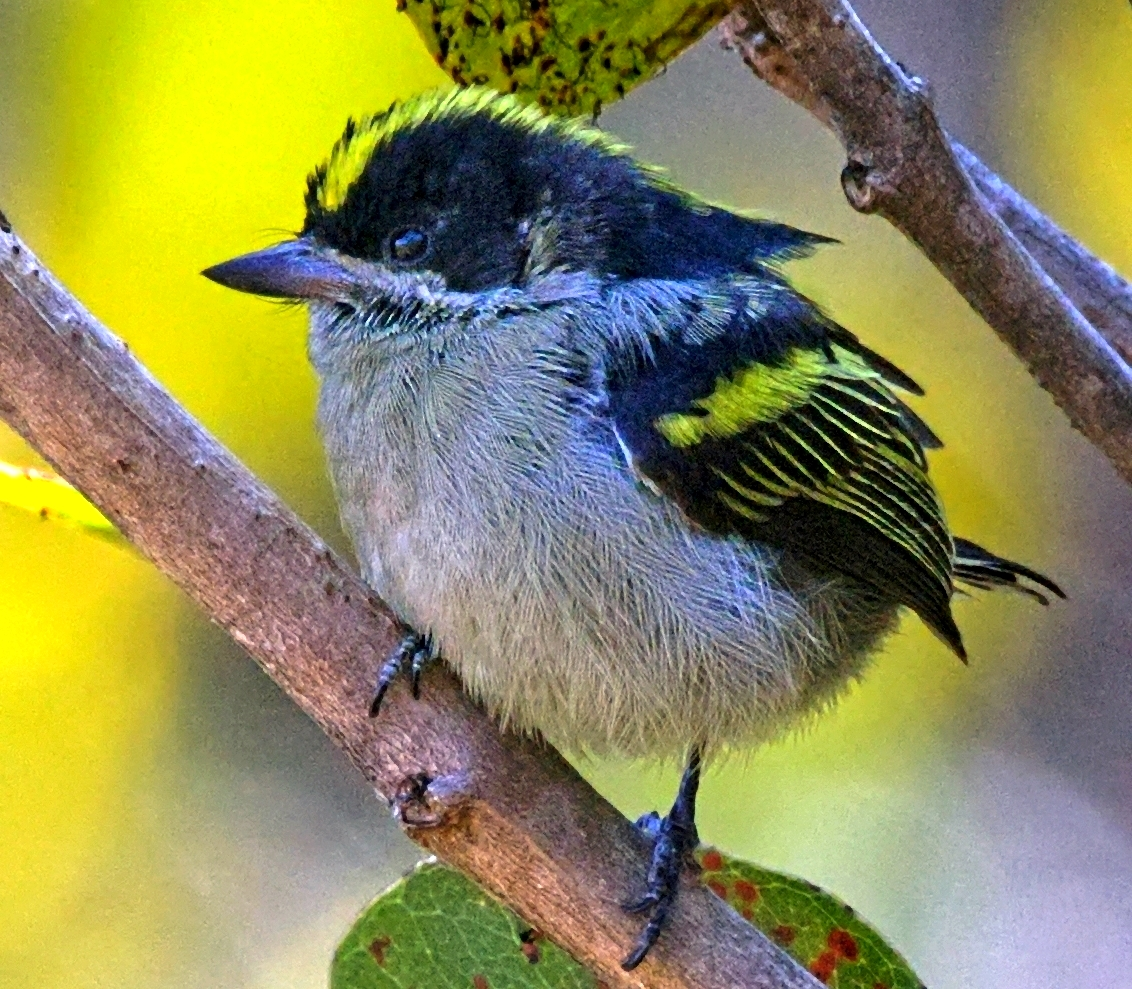
- P. coryphaea in Angola

Conservation status
- Least Concern (IUCN 3.1)

Scientific classification
- Kingdom: Animalia
- Phylum: Chordata
- Class: Aves
- Order: Piciformes
- Family: Lybiidae
- Genus: Pogoniulus
- Species: P. coryphaea

Binomial name
- Pogoniulus coryphaea (Reichenow, 1892)

Subspecies
- Pogoniulus coryphaea angolensis - (Boulton, 1931); Pogoniulus coryphaea coryphaea - (Reichenow, 1892); Pogoniulus coryphaea hildamariae - (Sclater, WL, 1938)

= Western tinkerbird =

Species of bird

The western tinkerbird (Pogoniulus coryphaea) is a species of bird in the family Lybiidae native to Central Africa, where it has been recorded at altitudes from 900 to 3,030 m (2,950 to 9,940 ft).

It has a threefold area of presence : the Angolan montane forest–grassland mosaic, the Western High Plateau and the Albertine Rift montane forests.
