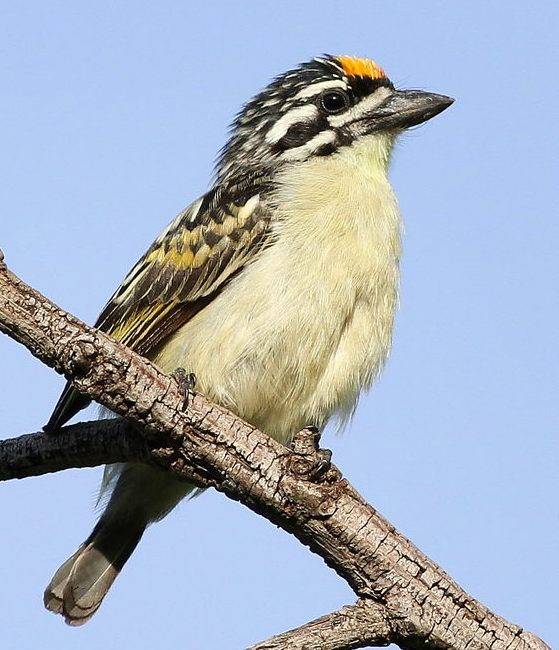

Conservation status
- Least Concern (IUCN 3.1)

Scientific classification
- Kingdom: Animalia
- Phylum: Chordata
- Class: Aves
- Order: Piciformes
- Family: Lybiidae
- Genus: Pogoniulus
- Species: P. chrysoconus

Binomial name
- Pogoniulus chrysoconus (Temminck, 1832)

Subspecies
- Pogoniulus chrysoconus chrysoconus (Temminck, 1832); Pogoniulus chrysoconus extoni (Layard, EL, 1871); Pogoniulus chrysoconus xanthostictus (Blundell & Lovat, 1899)

= Yellow-fronted tinkerbird =

Species of bird

The yellow-fronted tinkerbird (Pogoniulus chrysoconus) is a small bird in the family Lybiidae formerly known as yellow-fronted tinker barbet. It is sometimes considered conspecific with its southern counterpart, the red-fronted tinkerbird, Pogoniulus pusillus. Barbets are birds with bristles around the base of the bill and a world-wide tropical distribution.

== Subspecies ==
The subspecies vary with respect to size and colour tone of the plumage streaks. They include:

- P. c. chrysoconus (Temminck, 1832)
- P. c. extoni Layard, 1871 — southern Africa
- P. c. xanthostictus (Blundell & Lovat, 1899)

If P. c. extoni is restricted to the southernmost population occurring in southeastern Botswana, northern South Africa and Eswatini, the following two subspecies are also recognized:

- P. c. rhodesiae Grant, 1915 — Angola, Zambia, northeastern Namibia, Botswana and Zimbabwe
- P. c. dryas Clancey & Lawson, 1961 — eastern to northern Mozambique and northwards

== Range and habitat ==
The yellow-fronted tinkerbird is a widespread and frequently common resident breeder in much of Africa south of the Sahara Desert. It is associated with mesic, open to closed broadleaved or mixed woodlands and scrub. It is found in riparian vegetation but occurs only sparsely in dry savanna and teak woodlands.

== Description ==
The measured hooting call is delivered at a slower pace than that of the red-fronted tinkerbird

The yellow-fronted tinkerbird is approximately 11 cm (4.3 in) in length. It is plump, with a short neck, large head, and short tail. The adult has black upperparts heavily streaked with yellow and white. Its head has a strong black and white pattern, with a yellow forecrown spot. The underparts and rump are lemon yellow. Both sexes are similar in appearance, but young birds have a differentiating dark crown that lacks the distinct yellow spot.

== Breeding ==
Nest cavity

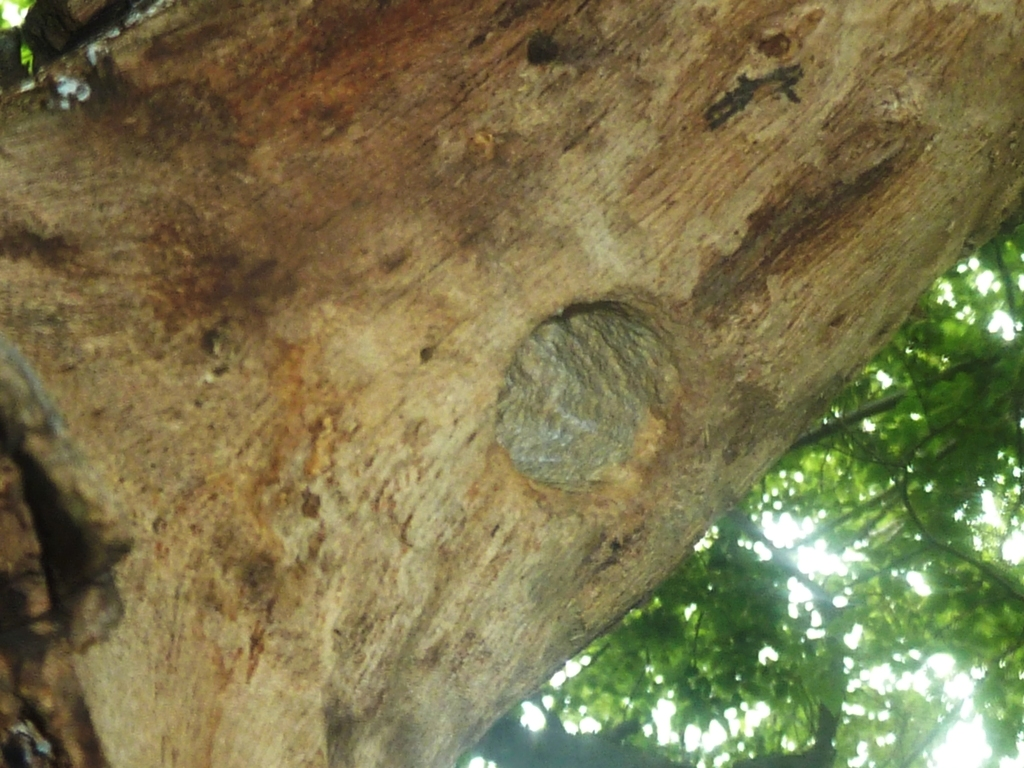
An active nest, excavated in a dead limb of a wild fig tree, Limpopo

Two chicks calling sequentially from the nest cavity during midsummer

The species nests in cavities excavated in dead limbs of trees, some 2 to 5 meters above the ground. A clutch of 2 to 3 matt white eggs is laid on a base of wood chips at the bottom of the nesting chamber. The nestlings call persistently, and are reared on fruit and insects by both parents. Nests usually do not survive a season and maybe usurped by larger species of barbet.

== Vocalizations ==
At about 100 repetitions per minute, the yellow-fronted tinkerbird's call is a fast tink-tink-tink-tink. Many barbets perch prominently, but, unlike their larger relatives, the smaller tinkerbirds sing from cover and are more frequently heard than seen.

== Diet ==
The yellow-fronted tinkerbird eats insects and fruit. Mistletoe fruits (Tapinanthus and Viscum spp.) are swallowed whole. The sticky seeds are regurgitated and wiped off on nearby branches. Across their distribution range, yellow-fronted tinkerbirds are the most important disperser of mistletoes.
