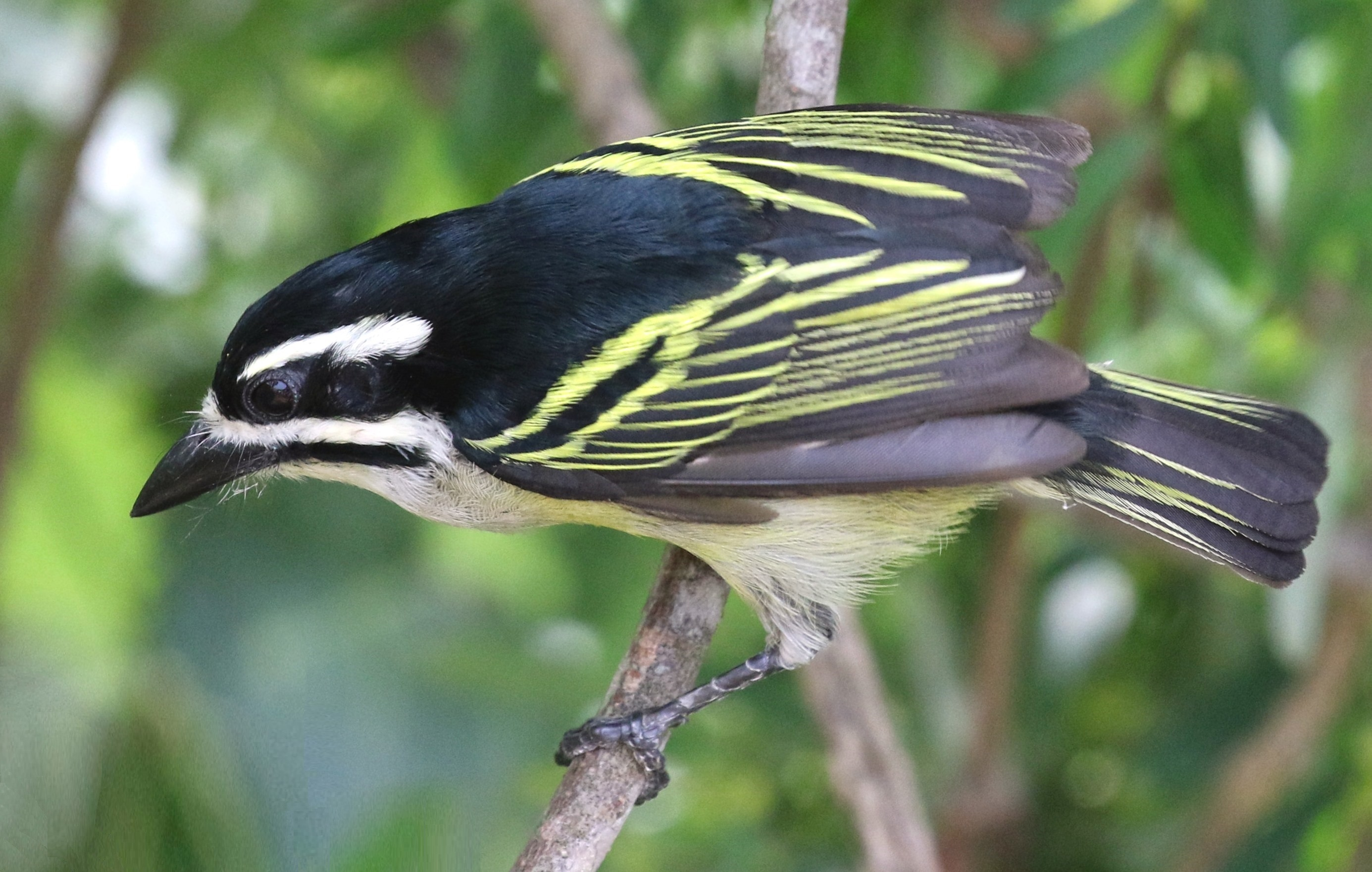
- Nominate subspecies in the Kruger N. P.

Conservation status
- Least Concern (IUCN 3.1)

Scientific classification
- Kingdom: Animalia
- Phylum: Chordata
- Class: Aves
- Order: Piciformes
- Family: Lybiidae
- Genus: Pogoniulus
- Species: P. bilineatus

Binomial name
- Pogoniulus bilineatus (Sundevall, 1850)

Synonyms
- Barbatula bilineata

Audio
- Call recorded in Saiwa Swamp, Kenya

= Yellow-rumped tinkerbird =

Species of bird

The yellow-rumped tinkerbird (Pogoniulus bilineatus) is a bird species in the family Lybiidae (African barbets), which is native to the moist tropical and subtropical regions of sub-Saharan Africa.

== Relationships ==
It used to be placed in the family Bucconidae (puffbirds), which has been split up; alternatively, it may be included in a vastly expanded Ramphastidae (toucans).

== Subspecies ==
Six subspecies are recognised:

- Pogoniulus bilineatus leucolaimus (Verreaux, JP & Verreaux, JBÉ, 1851) – Senegambia to South Sudan, Uganda, southeastern Democratic Republic of the Congo, and northern Angola
- Pogoniulus bilineatus poensis (Alexander, B, 1908) – highlands of Bioko Island (Gulf of Guinea)
- Pogoniulus bilineatus mfumbiri (Ogilvie-Grant, WR, 1907) – southwestern Uganda and eastern Democratic Republic of the Congo to western Tanzania and Zambia
- Pogoniulus bilineatus jacksoni (Sharpe, RB, 1897) – highlands of eastern Uganda, central Kenya, Rwanda, and northern Tanzania
- Pogoniulus bilineatus fischeri (Reichenow, A, 1880) – coastal Kenya to northeastern Tanzania; Zanzibar, and Mafia Island
- Pogoniulus bilineatus bilineatus (Sundevall, CJ, 1850) – eastern Zambia and southern Tanzania to Mozambique and eastern South Africa

== Range ==
It is found in Angola, Benin, Burundi, Cameroon, Central African Republic, Republic of the Congo, Democratic Republic of the Congo, Ivory Coast, Equatorial Guinea, Eswatini, Gabon, Gambia, Ghana, Guinea, Guinea-Bissau, Kenya, Liberia, Malawi, Mozambique, Nigeria, Rwanda, Senegal, Sierra Leone, South Africa, South Sudan, Tanzania, Togo, Uganda, Zambia, and Zimbabwe.

== Gallery ==
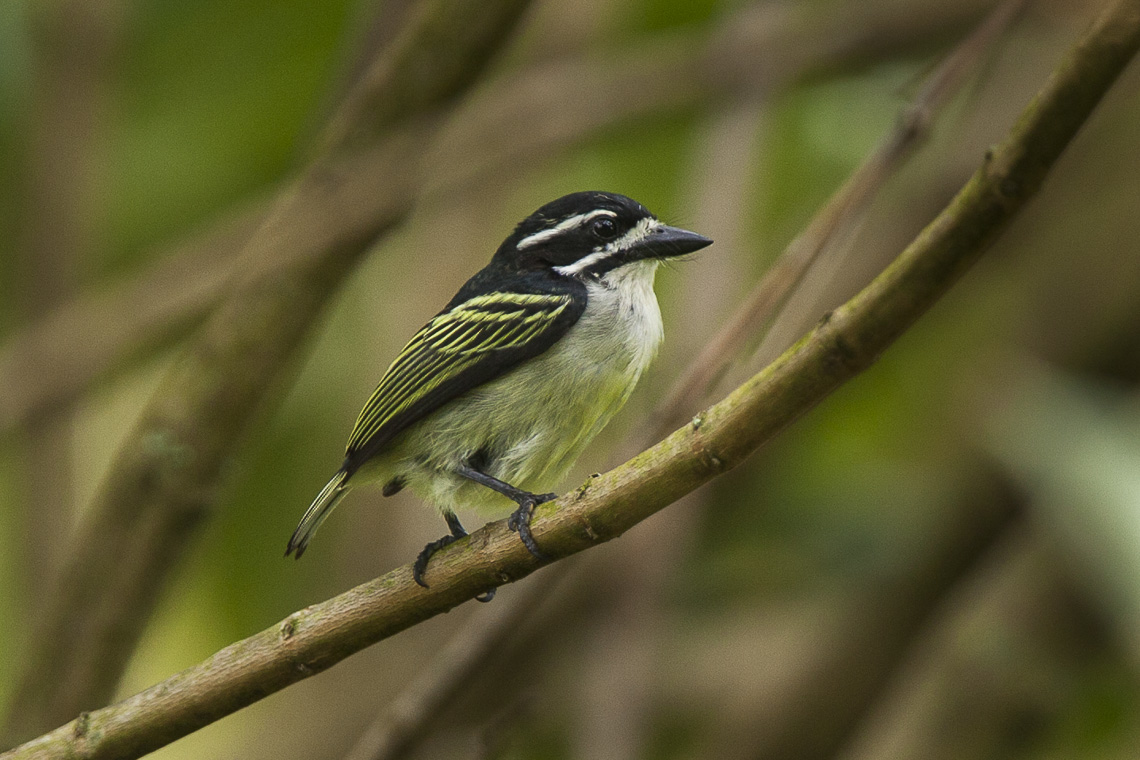
in Uganda

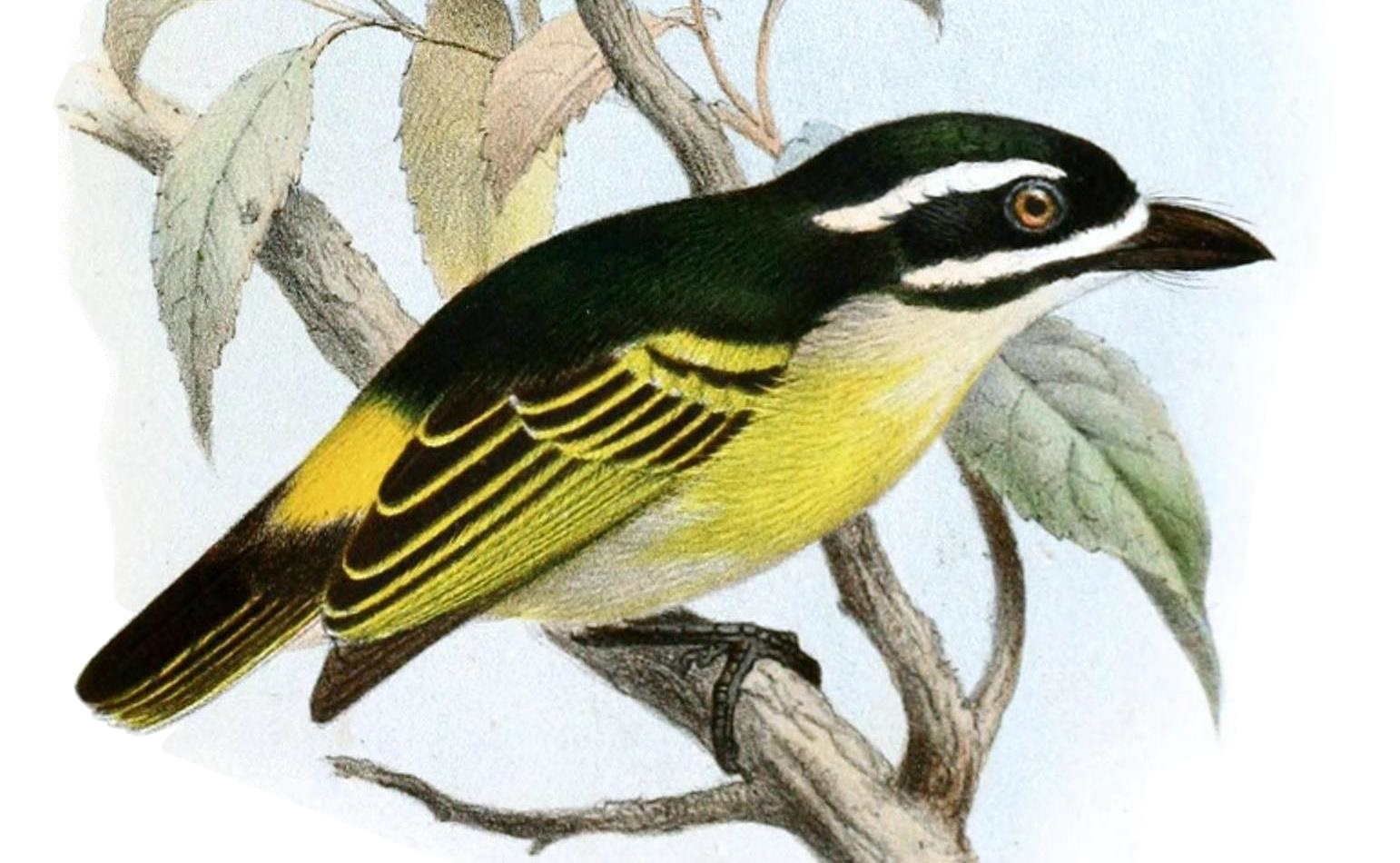
Illustration by J.G. Keulemans
