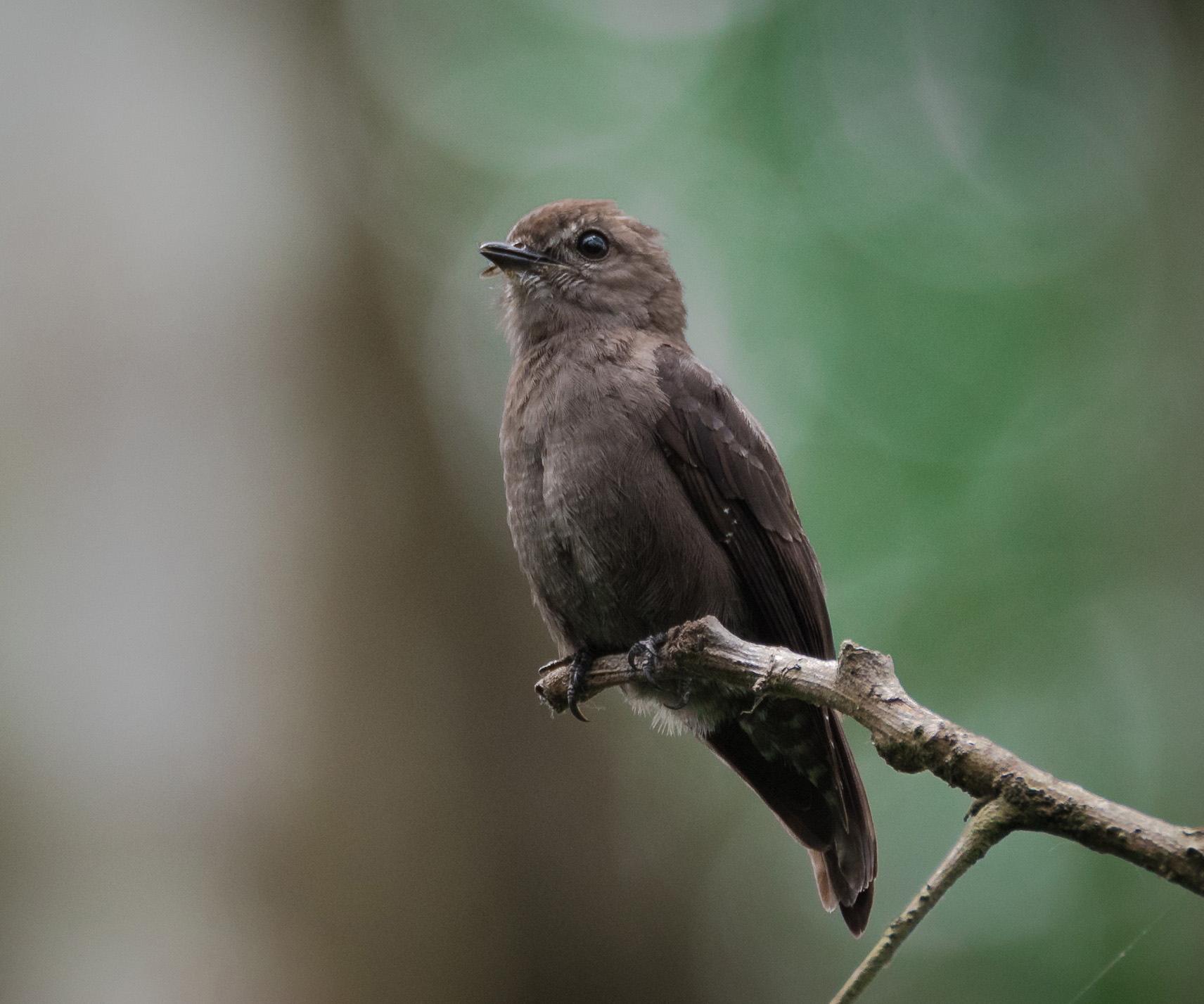
- Ussher's flycatcher (Artomyias ussheri)

Scientific classification
- Kingdom: Animalia
- Phylum: Chordata
- Class: Aves
- Order: Passeriformes
- Family: Muscicapidae
- Genus: Artomyias; Verreaux, J & Verreaux, É, 1855

Type species
- Artomyias fulinosa Verreaux, J & Verreaux, É, 1855

= Artomyias =

Genus of birds

Artomyias is a genus of small passerine birds in the large family Muscicapidae commonly known as the Old World flycatchers. They are restricted to sub-Saharan Africa.

== Taxonomy ==
The genus Artomyias was introduced in 1855 by the French naturalists Jules and Édouard Verreaux to accommodate a single species, Artomyias fulinosa Verreaux, J & Verreaux, É, 1855, the sooty flycatcher. This is therefore the type species. The genus name combines the genus Artamus that was introduced by Louis Vieillot in 1816 for the woodswallows with the Modern Latin myias meaning "flycatcher". The two species now placed in this genus were formerly placed in the genus Bradornis. They were moved to this genus based on the genetic distances and the differences in their morphology and behaviour.

The genus Artomyias contains the following two species:

Image	Common name	Scientific name	Distribution
	Ussher's flycatcher	Artomyias ussheri	Upper Guinean forests
	Sooty flycatcher	Artomyias fuliginosus	central Africa
