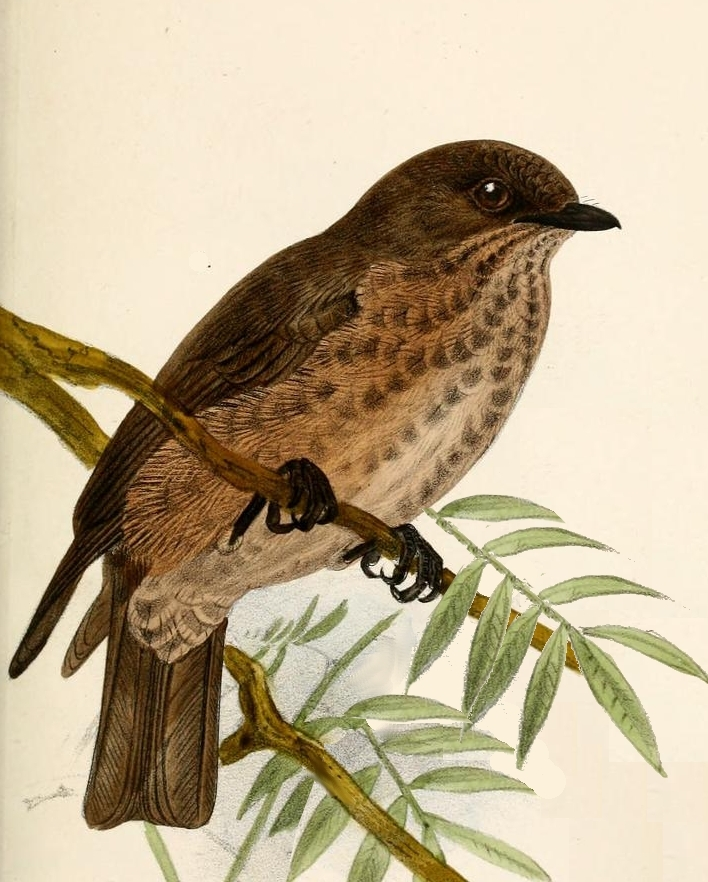
- illustration by Keulemans, 1879
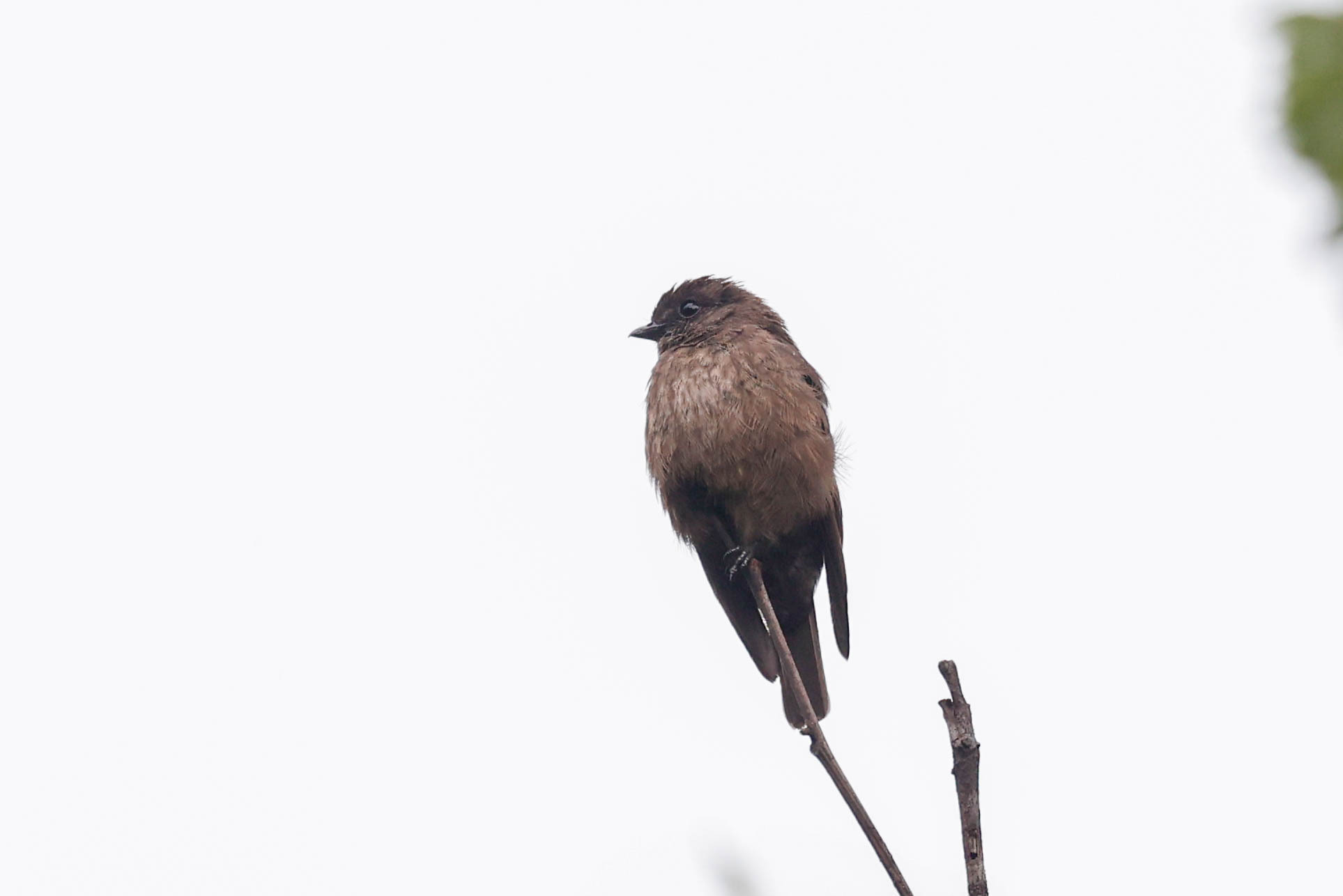

Conservation status
- Least Concern (IUCN 3.1)

Scientific classification
- Kingdom: Animalia
- Phylum: Chordata
- Class: Aves
- Order: Passeriformes
- Family: Muscicapidae
- Genus: Artomyias
- Species: A. fuliginosa

Binomial name
- Artomyias fuliginosa Verreaux, J & Verreaux, É, 1855

Synonyms
- Muscicapa infuscata Cassin, 1855; Bradornis fuliginosus

= Sooty flycatcher =

Species of bird

The sooty flycatcher (Artomyias fuliginosa) is a species of bird in the Old world flycatcher family Muscicapidae. It is found in Angola, Cameroon, Central African Republic, Republic of the Congo, Democratic Republic of the Congo, Equatorial Guinea, Gabon, Nigeria, South Sudan, Tanzania, Uganda, and Zambia. Its natural habitat is subtropical or tropical moist lowland forests.

== Taxonomy ==
The sooty flycatcher was formally described in 1855 by the French naturalists Jules and Édouard Verreaux under the current binomial name Artomyias fuliginosa based on a specimen collected in Gabon. The specific epithet is from Late Latin fuliginosus meaning "sooty", from Latin fuligo, fuliginis meaning "soot".

Two subspecies are recognised:

- Artomyias fuliginosa fuliginosa Verreaux, J & Verreaux, É, 1855 – south Nigeria to central DR Congo and Angola
- Artomyias fuliginosa minuscula Grote, 1922 – east DR Congo and Uganda
