= Trachylaemus =

Scientific classification
- Kingdom: Animalia
- Phylum: Chordata
- Class: Aves
- Order: Piciformes
- Family: Lybiidae
- Subfamily: Trachyphoninae
- Genus: Trachylaemus; Reichenow, 1891

Type species
- Trachyphonus purpuratus Verreaux, J & Verreaux, É, 1851

Genus of birds

Trachylaemus is a genus of birds in the African barbet family (Lybiidae). The genus is closely related to the genus Trachyphonus.

== Taxonomy ==
The genus Trachylaemus was introduced in 1891 by the German ornithologist Anton Reichenow. The name combines Ancient Greek τραχυς/trakhus meaning "rough" or "shaggy" with λαιμος/laimos meaning "throat". Reichenow subsequently designated the type species as Trachyphonus purpuratus Verreaux, J & Verreaux, É, 1851, the eastern yellow-billed barbet.

The genus contains two species:

Image	Common name	Scientific name	Distribution
	Western yellow-billed barbet	Trachylaemus goffinii	Sierra Leone to southwest Nigeria
	Eastern yellow-billed barbet	Trachylaemus purpuratus	southeast Nigeria to west Kenya

These two species were formerly placed in the genus Trachyphonus.
