= Negro of Banyoles =

Taxidermied human

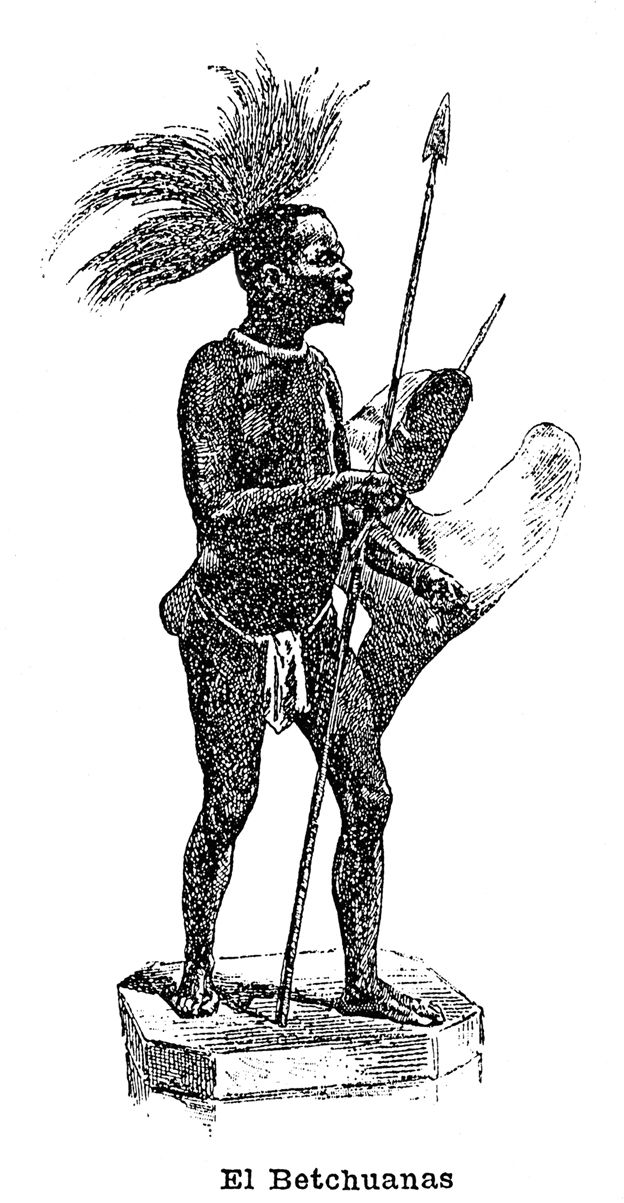
An illustration of the Negro of Banyoles from an 1888 booklet

The Negro of Banyoles (Catalan: negre de Banyoles; Spanish: negro de Banyoles or negro de Bañolas) was the taxidermied body of a Southern African man that was displayed for more than 80 years at the Darder Museum in Banyoles, Catalonia, Spain. Originally preserved by French taxidermists in the 1830's and exhibited as a natural history specimen, the display became the subject of an international controversy over the public exhibition of human remains in 1991. Following years of debate involving activists, African governments, the United Nations, and UNESCO, the remains were removed from display in 1997 and repatriated to Botswana in 2000 for burial.

== Identity and description ==
The man who became known as the Negro of Banyoles was estimated to have been about 27 years old when he died, based on an analysis of his teeth; he did not have signs of a violent death and is believed to have died of a lung disease. He was originally identified as a member of the San people. According to Dutch writer and journalist Frank Westerman and the documentary El negre té nom ("The Negro Has a Name"), the individual may have been Chief Molawa VIII, who was born between 1800 and 1805 and came from Litakou (now Dithakong, South Africa), and is the only Chief in his lineage without a known burial. A DNA sample was taken during a 1995 analysis in an attempt to identify possible descendants and relatives but no update on the results were ever given.

== Exhibition and display ==
In 1830, French natural history collectors and taxidermists Jules Verreaux and Édouard Verreaux were collecting specimens throughout southern Africa and encountered the burial of a Tswana man, who were then referred to as Bechuana. Jules Verreaux wrote that the man's grave was guarded, and that he had to dig the corpse up at midnight to avoid being killed. Later examinations found that the body had been extensively altered for exhibition. A wooden spine and shoulder supports were added, along with artificial eyes, hair, and genitals. The figure was also stuffed with materials including newspaper, and arsenic was used during the preservation process.

The brothers exhibited the remains in France, where they were displayed in various shops during the nineteenth century. A popular exhibit, the man's body continued to serve as a main attraction as late as 1872, despite this critics complained that the taxidermy was an unimpressive sight. After the Maison Verreaux closed in 1878 most of the taxidermy collection was sold to the American Museum of Natural History, the remaining pieces, including the man, were sold at retail. Around 1886, Catalan veterinary surgeon and natural history collector Francesc Darder purchased the exhibit in Paris and added it to his collection. By that point the history of the taxidermy had been lost, and it was labelled as a Bushman. Darder displayed the body at the 1888 Barcelona Universal Exposition to a positive reception, later Darder tried exhibiting a large amount of his collection, possibly including the man, at the Café Novedades in Barcelona but was forced out due to academic disgust towards his "exhibitionist zeal". Shortly before his death Darder donated his collection which became the Darder Museum in Banyoles, Catalonia, in 1916, the remains became part of the museum's collection under the name Object No.1004.

For more than 80 years, from 1916 to 1997, the man was displayed at the Darder Museum wearing a loincloth, feathered headdress, and carrying a spear. The exhibit became one of the museum's best-known attractions. At an unknown point the original loincloth was replaced with a less revealing one. According to later accounts, museum staff periodically applied shoe polish to maintain his appearance.

== Controversy ==
For much of the twentieth century, the Negro of Banyoles was displayed at the Darder Museum without significant public objection. On 29 October 1991, Alphonse Arcelin, a physician of Haitian origin living in Catalonia, wrote to Banyoles mayor Joan Solana and called for the exhibit's removal. His campaign attracted widespread media attention and sparked debate about the public display of human remains. Arcelin’s campaign met resistance from Banyoles town council, which voted to retain the display. Councillor Carles Abella defended the town’s ownership of the remains and rejected accusations of racism, arguing that human rights applied only to the living. Mayor Joan Solana also defended the exhibition, comparing it with the museum’s displays of other human remains. Arcelin gained support from Nigeria’s ambassador to Spain, Yusuf Mamman, who consulted other African countries and raised protests with the Barcelona Olympic organisers and Spain’s foreign ministry.

The issue gained international attention during preparations for the 1992 Summer Olympics, when Banyoles hosted rowing events. Several African governments supported Arcelin's campaign and calls for the Negro of Banyoles to be returned to Africa. Federico Mayor Zaragoza, then Director-General of UNESCO, discussed the matter with Solana, and later Kofi Annan, as Secretary-General of the United Nations, also expressed interest in the case. The dispute also raised concerns among museum organisations about the display and return of human remains. Calls for removal were supported by public figures such as Jesse Jackson and Magic Johnson.

In 1997, the issue was debated by the United Nations and the Organisation of African Unity. The Negro of Banyoles was removed from public display in March of that year. While some commentators described the exhibit as a relic of colonialism, many residents of Banyoles and the surrounding area opposed its removal. After more than 80 years in the museum, some viewed the Negro of Banyoles as part of the local community. Some Catalan Nationalists considered the man a part of their cultural heritage and wore T-Shirts featuring him to protest removal.

== Repatriation ==
The Dardar Museum removed the Negro of Banyoles from display in 1997 as the OAU and Spanish Government began consultation, other human remains, such as the skin of an Arab, were also placed in storage. In 2000 the Negro of Banyoles was transferred to the National Museum of Anthropology in Madrid to separate the biological and artificial elements. It was decided to have the skin remain in Madrid due to its brittleness.

Botswana's government offered to assist the Organisation of African Unity (OAU) in burying the man once all of his remains had been returned to Africa. This was due to the fact that Botswana had the largest community of San peoples (about 55,000) at the time. In 2000, Botswana’s Ministry of Foreign Affairs and Gaborone City Council coordinated preparations for the return. A reference committee brought together university, museum, archival and municipal representatives and legal advisers to inform the public, particularly San communities, and seek support for the repatriation and reburial. According to historian Jeff Ramsay, Spanish authorities announced a further delay in February 2000 over controversy surrounding human rights in Botswana. University of Botswana scholars, working with researchers in South Africa and elsewhere, had meanwhile gathered evidence pointing to South African origins. South African museum authorities suggested a possible connection to Kgatlane, an abandoned Batlhaping settlement whose descendants still lived in the region. This identification remained tentative, raising questions about Botswana as the destination for reburial. The skull and remaining bones were subsequently sent to Botswana and arrived on 4 October 2000, Ramsay reported that the preserved tissue and accompanying objects were not returned, and Spanish representatives offered no explanation for their absence. He was buried the following day at Tsholofelo Park in Gaborone, and his gravesite was later declared a national monument.

According to historian Jeff Ramsay, the repatriation was intended as an act of restitution and reconciliation that would symbolically return an African man to his homeland after nearly 170 years of exhibition in Europe. However, the process quickly became controversial. Many Batswana had expected the complete preserved body that had been displayed in Spain for more than a century. According to Ramsay, what arrived was not a body but a skull and a small number of bones contained in an unvarnished wooden box. The preserved skin, soft tissue, and ethnographic objects that had accompanied the display in Spain were not returned, and Spanish representatives provided no public explanation for their absence.

Treatment of his burial in Botswana also attracted controversy due to various factors, such as his gravesite being located in a community playground instead of a cemetery, the lack of Tswana people attending the burial event, a speaker at the burial conflating "El Negro" with "El Nino", and the Christian nature of the ceremony. Many assumed the man's spirit would be restless due to the circumstances of the burial ceremony which was reinforced by the appearance of a drought soon after. Following the burial, Gaborone City Council initially managed the grave, but concerns arose over its neglect. Responsibility was transferred to the Botswana National Museum in 2006 following public criticism. The museum introduced signage and historical information to improve the site’s interpretation and visibility.

== Legacy ==
The Darder Museum currently avoids any references to the controversy of the negre de Banyoles. The only record of the San in the museum is a silent video with black and white images on a small plasma screen. The video allows people to see the San as he was displayed until his removal.

Several books have dealt with the el negre controversy, most notably El Negro en ik (El Negro and me) by Frank Westerman, which shows that naturalist Georges Cuvier knew about the man.

The story of El Negro inspired Glenn Eichler to write the dark comedy graphic novel Stuffed!, with art by Nick Bertozzi. The story follows a man who inherits a taxidermied African warrior and tries to find a dignified way to remove it from his life while dealing with the family, racial, and political effects.

== See also ==
- Angelo Soliman, an African-born Austrian courtier taxidermied after death
- Human zoo
- Julia Pastrana, a sideshow performer preserved via taxidermy
- Ota Benga
- Repatriation of human remains
- Saartjie Baartman
- Scientific racism
- Triumphs of a Taxidermist, short story by H. G. Wells featuring a taxidermied African.

== Bibliography ==
- Davies, Caitlin: The Return of El Negro. Johannesburg: Penguin Books 2003.
- Fock, Stefanie: »Un individu de raça negroide«. El Negro und die Wunderkammern des Rassismus. In: Entfremdete Körper. Rassismus als Leichenschändung, ed. Wulf D. Hund. Bielefeld: transcript 2009, pp. 165 – 204.
- Westermann, Frank: El Negro en ik. Amsterdam: Atlas 2004.
