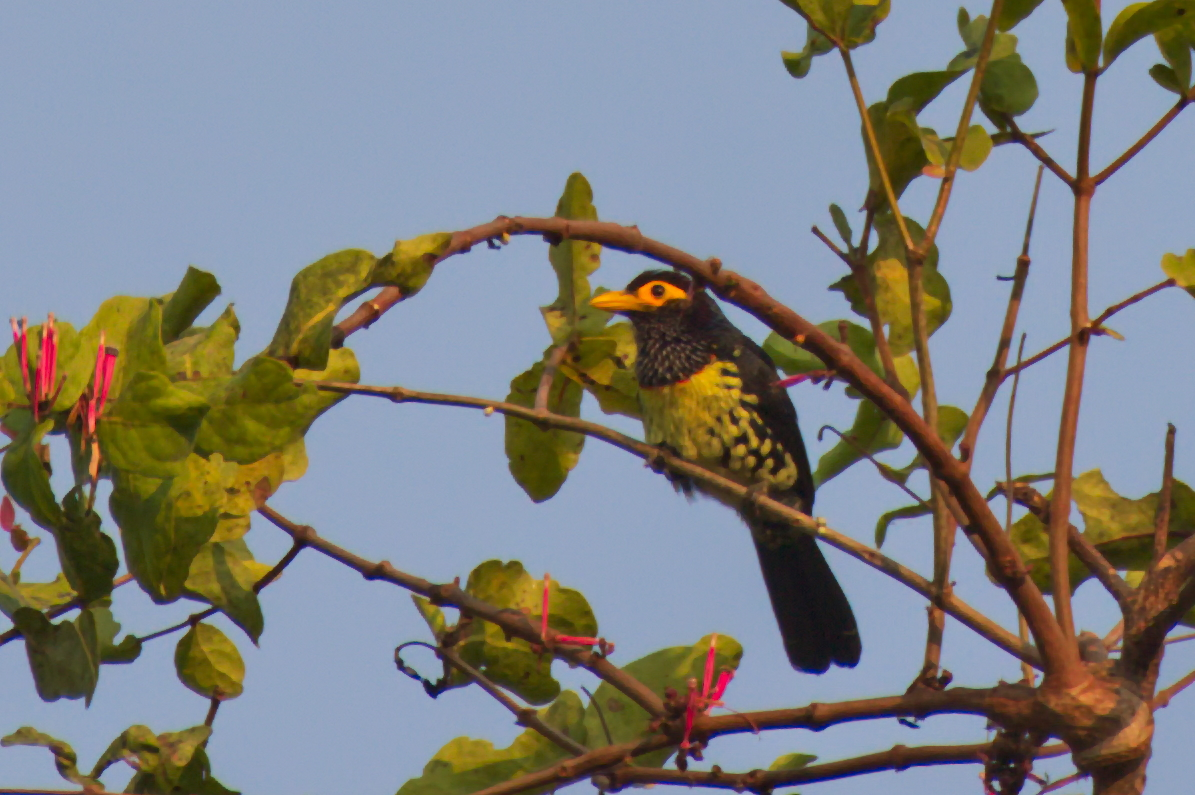

Conservation status
- Least Concern (IUCN 3.1)

Scientific classification
- Kingdom: Animalia
- Phylum: Chordata
- Class: Aves
- Order: Piciformes
- Family: Lybiidae
- Genus: Trachylaemus
- Species: T. purpuratus

Binomial name
- Trachylaemus purpuratus (Verreaux & Verreaux, 1851)

= Eastern yellow-billed barbet =

Species of bird

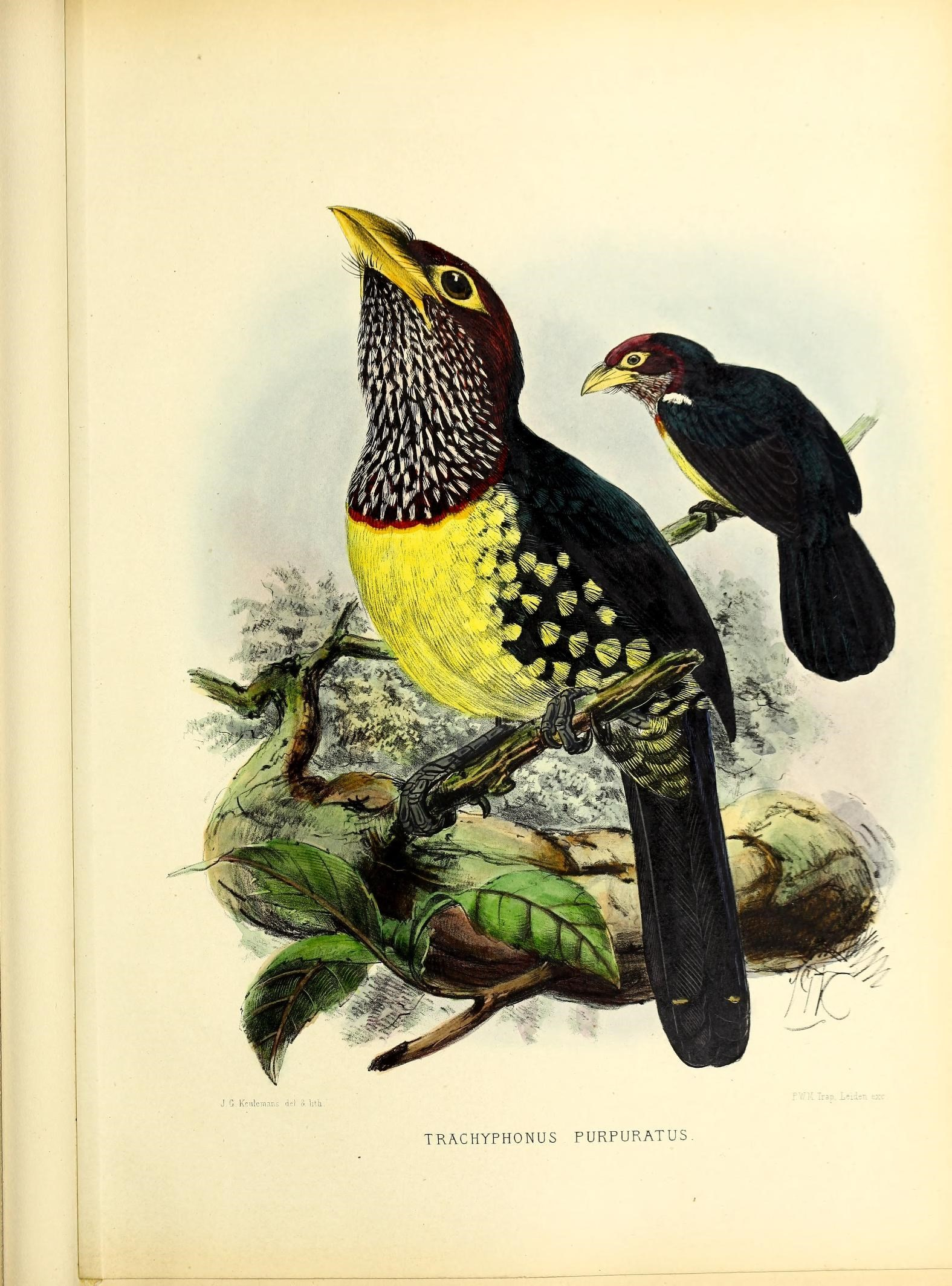
Yellow-billed Barbet

The eastern yellow-billed barbet (Trachylaemus purpuratus) is a species of bird in the Lybiidae family. It was formerly considered to be conspecific with the western yellow-billed barbet.

It is found in Angola, Cameroon, Central African Republic, Republic of the Congo, Democratic Republic of the Congo, Equatorial Guinea, Gabon, Nigeria, Uganda, Rwanda, Burundi and western Kenya.

Two subspecies are recognised:

- T. p. purpuratus (Verreaux, J & Verreaux, É, 1851) – southeast Nigeria to Central African Republic, north, central DR Congo and northwest Angola
- T. p. elgonensis Sharpe, 1891 – south Sudan and northeast DR Congo to west Kenya
