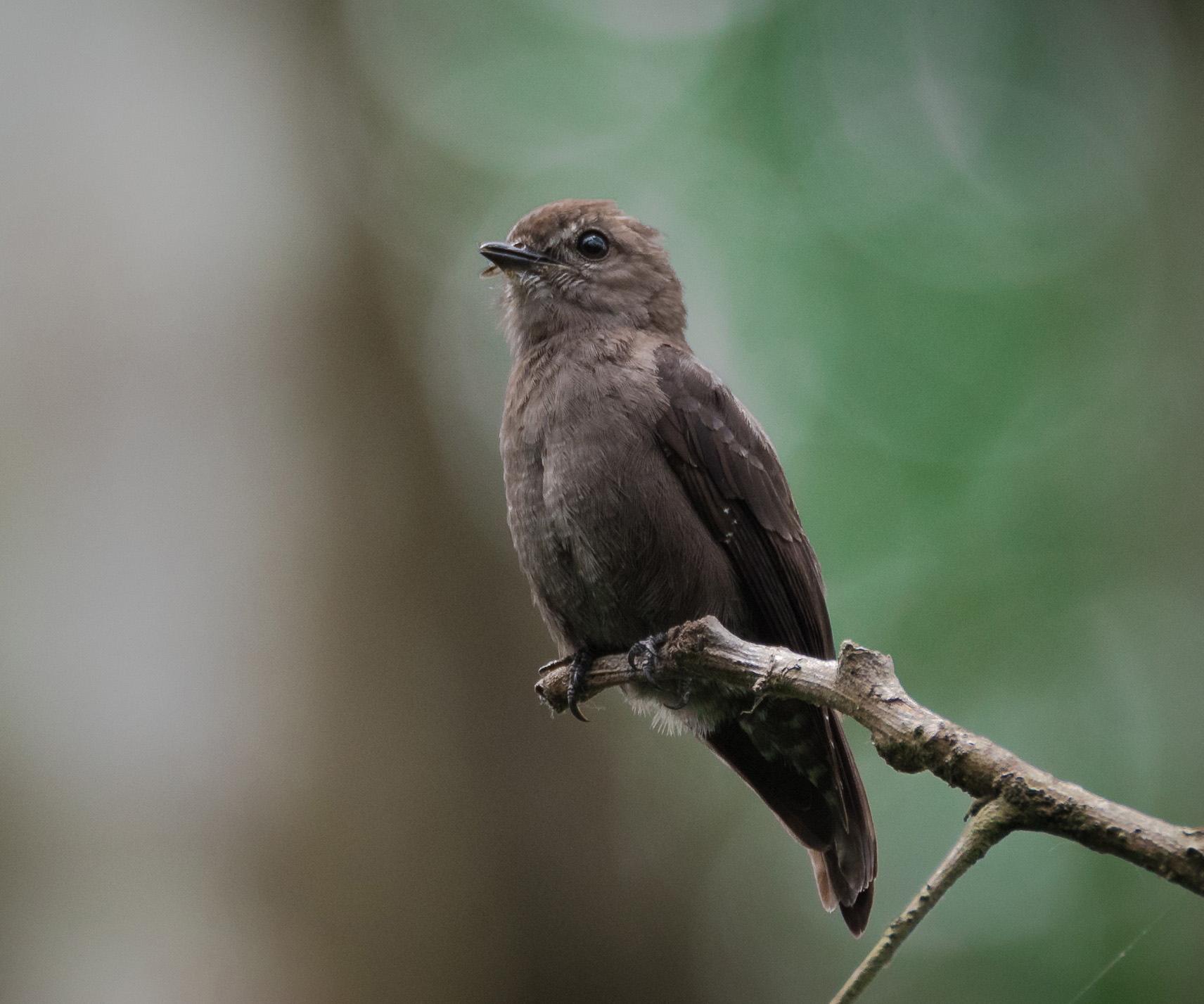

Conservation status
- Least Concern (IUCN 3.1)

Scientific classification
- Kingdom: Animalia
- Phylum: Chordata
- Class: Aves
- Order: Passeriformes
- Family: Muscicapidae
- Genus: Artomyias
- Species: A. ussheri

Binomial name
- Artomyias ussheri Sharpe, 1871

Synonyms
- Bradornis ussheri; Muscicapa ussheri

= Ussher's flycatcher =

Ussher's Flycatcher

Species of bird

Ussher's flycatcher (Artomyias ussheri) is a species of bird in the family Muscicapidae. It is found in Ivory Coast, Ghana, Guinea, Guinea-Bissau, Liberia, Nigeria, and Sierra Leone. Its natural habitats are subtropical or tropical dry forests and subtropical or tropical moist lowland forests.

== Taxonomy ==
Ussher's flycatcher was formally described in 1871 by the English ornithologist Richard Bowdler Sharpe based on a specimen collected at Abrobonko in present-day Ghana, by the British colonial administrator Herbert Taylor Ussher, who became Governor of the Gold Coast. Sharpe coined the current binomial name Artomyias ussheri where the specific epithet was named after the collector. The type locality, Abrobonko, is between Cape Coast and Elmina on the lower Sweet (Kakum) river. The species is monotypic: no subspecies are recognised. It was formerly placed in the genus Bradornis.
