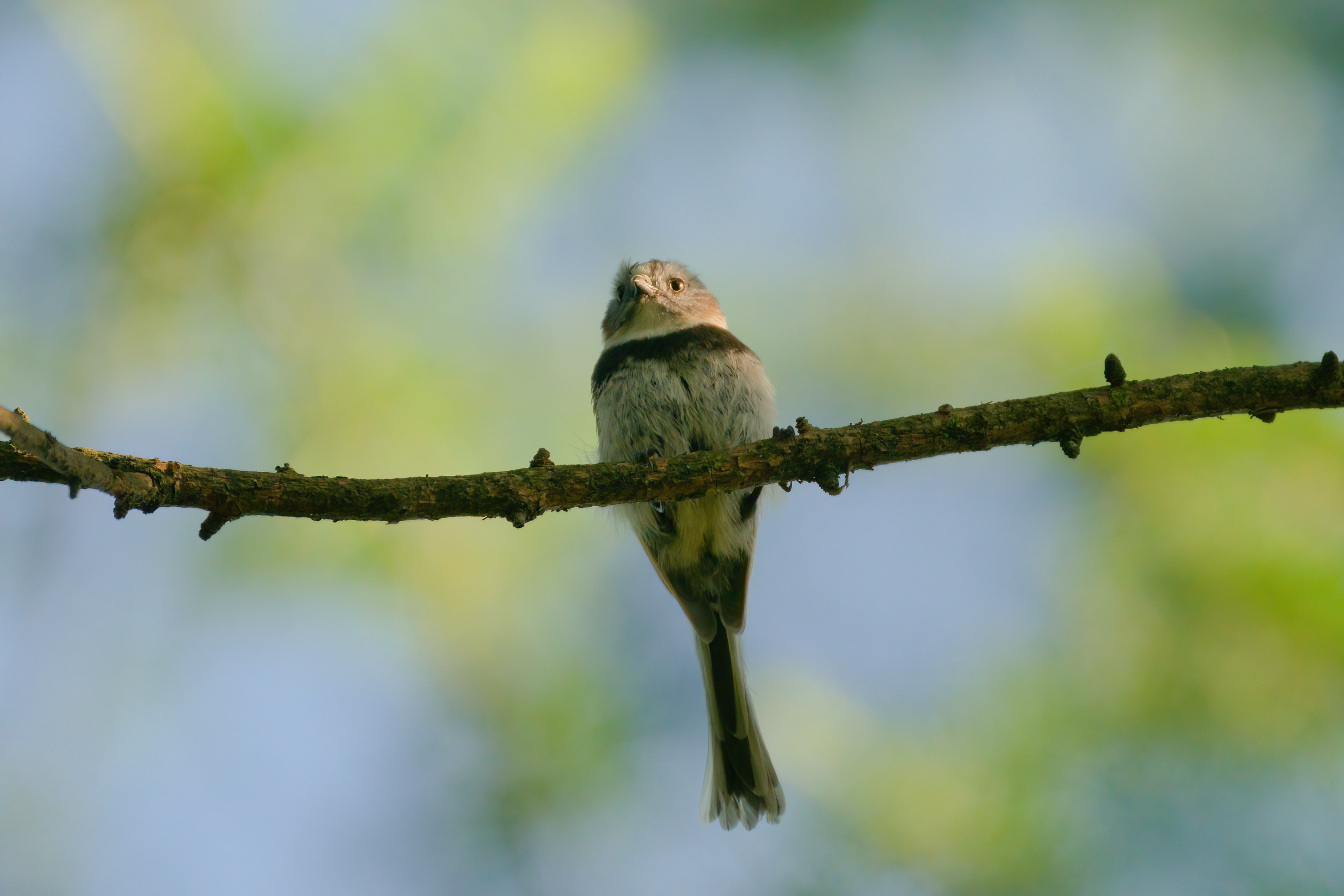

Conservation status
- Least Concern (IUCN 3.1)

Scientific classification
- Kingdom: Animalia
- Phylum: Chordata
- Class: Aves
- Order: Passeriformes
- Family: Aegithalidae
- Genus: Aegithalos
- Species: A. fuliginosus

Binomial name
- Aegithalos fuliginosus (Verreaux, 1869)
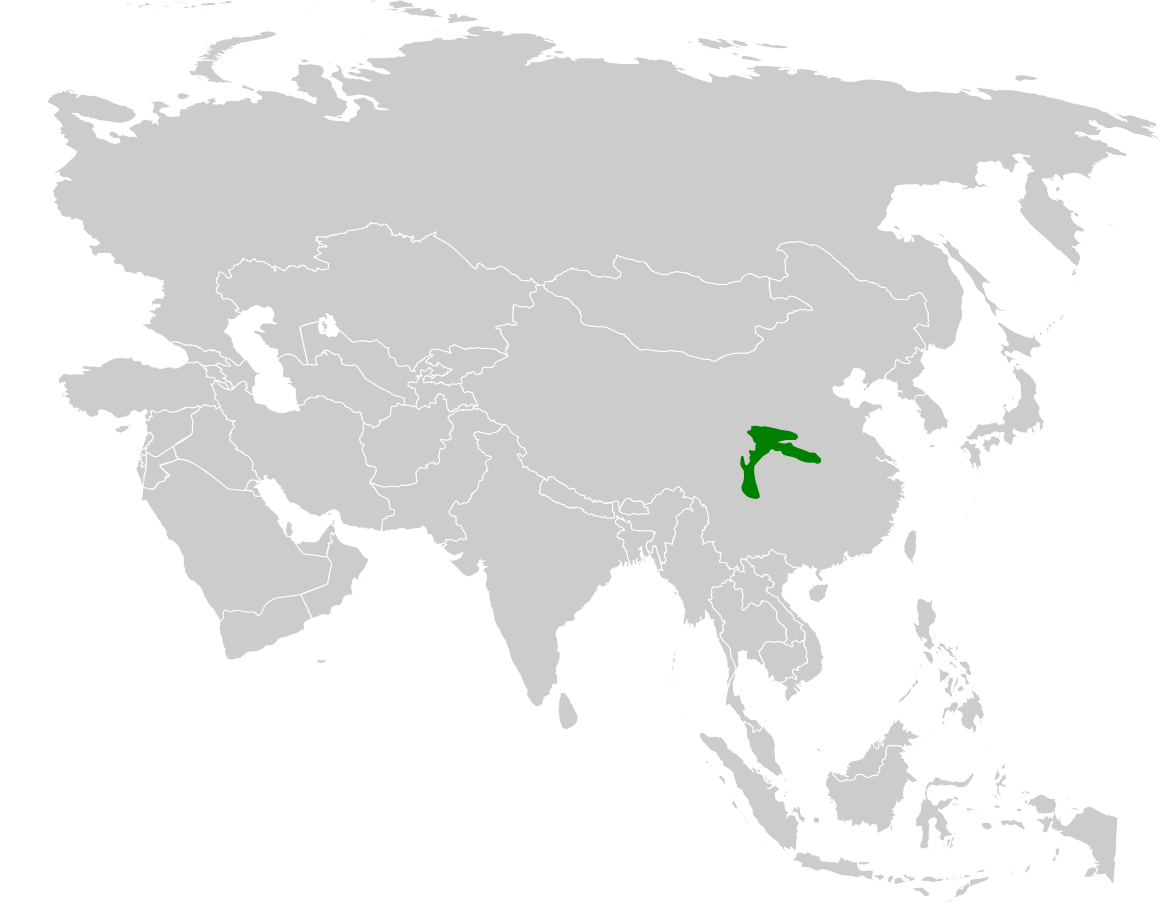

= Sooty bushtit =

Species of bird

The sooty bushtit (Aegithalos fuliginosus), also known as the sooty tit, white-necklaced tit or white-necklaced bushtit, is a small passerine bird in the bushtit family Aegithalidae. It is endemic to central China, where it inhabits foothill and montane forests. Its overall browner plumage and white collar distinguish it from other small tits and bushtits. It is a social bird and forages in flocks, often with other bird species.

== Taxonomy ==
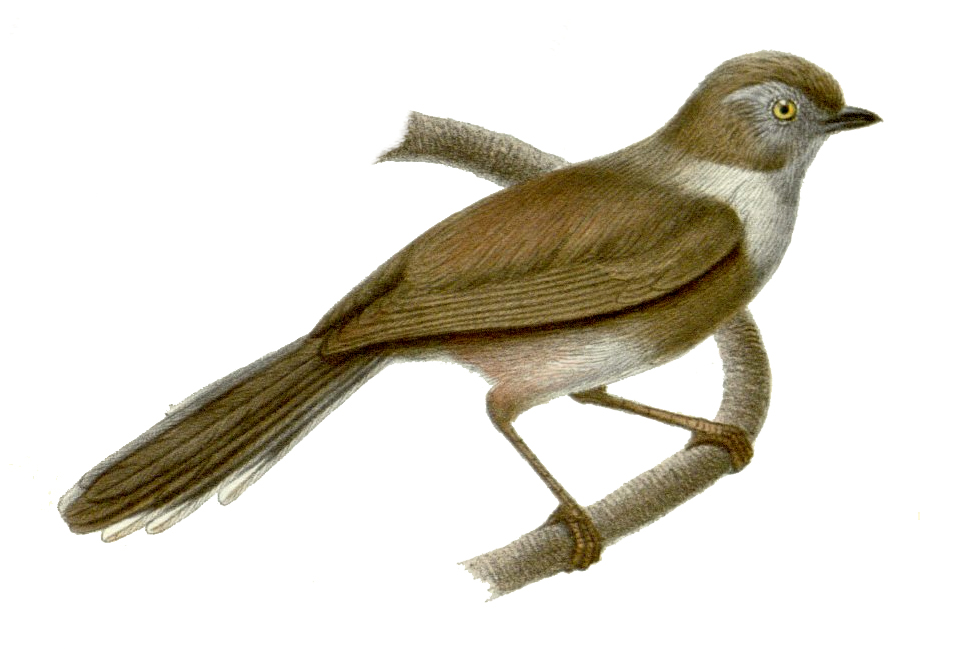
Illustration by Josephe Huët

The sooty bushtit was formally described by Jules Verreaux in 1869 under the current name Aegithalos fuliginosus. The generic name Aegithalos is a term used by Aristotle for some European tits, including the long-tailed tit. The specific epithet fuliginosus is Latin for "sooty", from the words fuligo and fuliginis, in reference to its dark brown coloration.

== Status and distribution ==
The sooty bushtit inhabits mostly forested mountainous areas in central China, specifically in Sichuan, southern Gansu, southern Shaanxi, and southwestern Hubei. It is listed as a least-concern species by the IUCN.
