= Lion Attacking a Dromedary =

Orientalist diorama by Édouard Verreaux

- Lion Attaquant un Dromadaire (French)
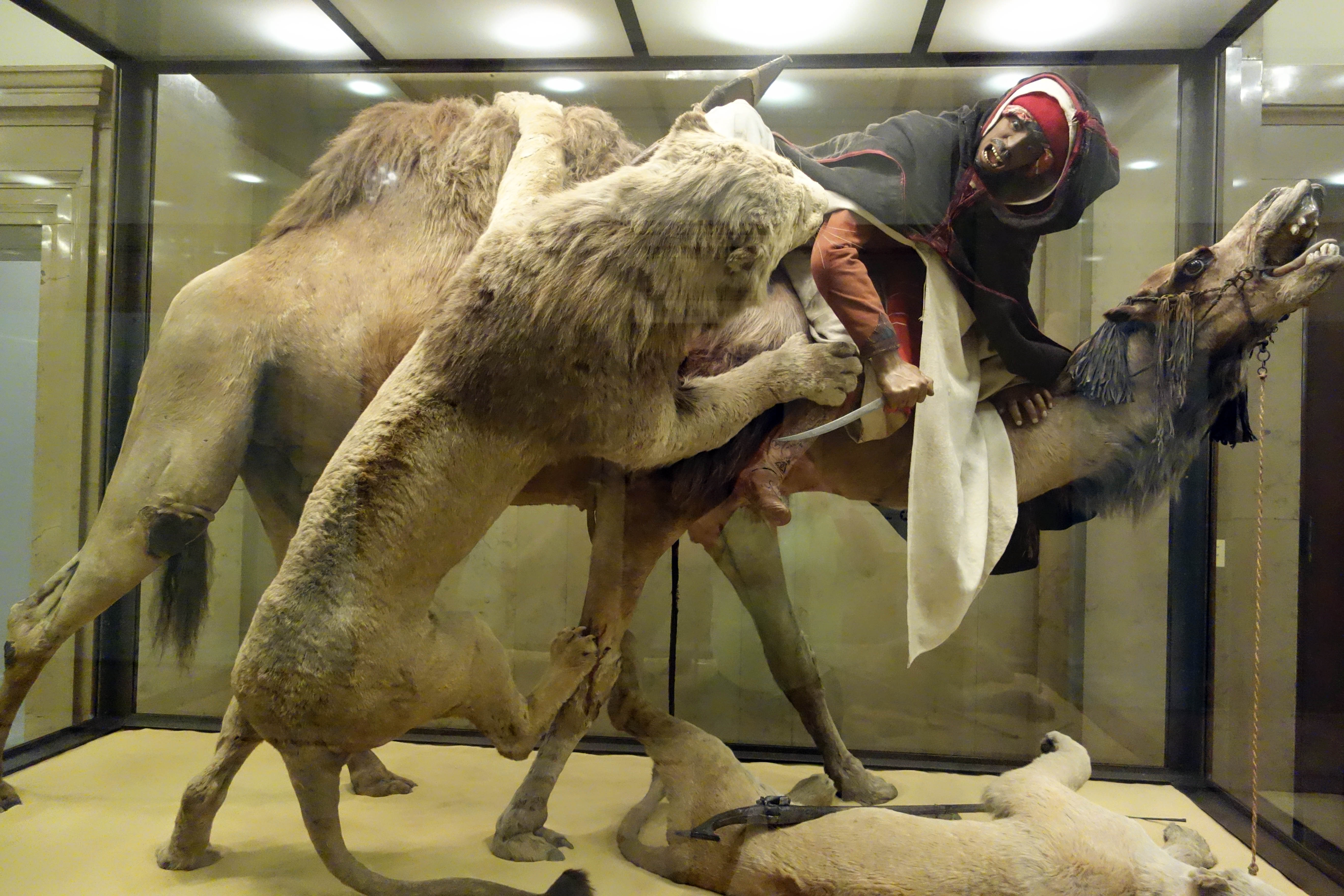
- The restored Lion Attacking a Dromedary in 2018
- Artist: Édouard Verreaux
- Medium: Taxidermy
- Movement: Orientalism
- Location: Carnegie Museum of Natural History, Pittsburgh, Pennsylvania

Lion Attacking a Dromedary (Note: The diorama has been known by various other names such as Lion Attaquant un Dromadaire (the original French name), Arab Courier Attacked by Lions (the name until 2017), and, rarely Camel Driver Attacked by Lions.) was an orientalist diorama by French taxidermist Édouard Verreaux in the collection of the Carnegie Museum of Natural History. It depicts a fictional scene of a man on a dromedary struggling to fend off an attack by a Barbary lion.

The diorama was created for the Paris Exposition of 1867 and subsequently shown at the American Museum of Natural History, Centennial Exposition, and the Carnegie Museum of Natural History. Originally criticized for its sensationalism, since the 1890s, Lion Attacking a Dromedary has also been criticized for its lack of accuracy. The male figure, referred to as an Arab by Verreaux, is a fictional pastiche of five North African cultures. Despite these issues, the diorama is considered to be Verreaux's masterpiece and was highly influential in multiple artistic fields.

Lion Attacking a Dromedary was purchased by the Carnegie Museum of Natural History in 1898. As part of a 2017 restoration, the museum found human remains in the diorama. In 2020, the diorama was removed from view in response to the Black Lives Matter movement and the lack of accuracy. Later that year it was returned to public view with additional context. Three years later, the exhibit was permanently removed from public view due to a newly enacted human-remains policy. The Diorama was dismantled shortly thereafter, the museum has stated a replica will not be made.

== Creation and early exhibitions ==
Lion Attacking a Dromedary was created by French taxidermist Édouard Verreaux. Édouard was part of Maison Verreaux, a French taxidermy studio, with his brother Jules Verreaux. While modern taxidermy typically only uses the skin, 19th century French taxidermy techniques made use of the skull in the internal structure for greater accuracy. Verreaux created the work with the skull of a human, two barbary lions, and dromedary that were collected in Africa, inside all of the models is a wireframe structure stuffed with straw. The location from which the skins and bones were sourced and the date on which they were collected are unknown. The skull could either be from one of the Verreaux brothers trips abroad or from a local Parisian, possibly taken from the catacombs. The positioning of the human and lions in the diorama was based on Arab Horseman Killing a Boar and The Tiger Hunt by French sculptor Antoine-Louis Barye.

Lion Attacking a Dromedary was first displayed during the final weeks of the Paris Exposition of 1867, it attracted both immense praise from observers and scorn from traditional taxidermists who considered the scene artistic instead of scientific as it broke with the established trends of the field. It would win a gold medal at the exposition, notably trumping the work of Verreaux's British rival Edwin Ward. Verreaux would die in 1868, then after much of his work including Lion Attacking a Dromedary was sold to the American Museum of Natural History and shown at the 1876 Centennial Exposition.

== Composition ==
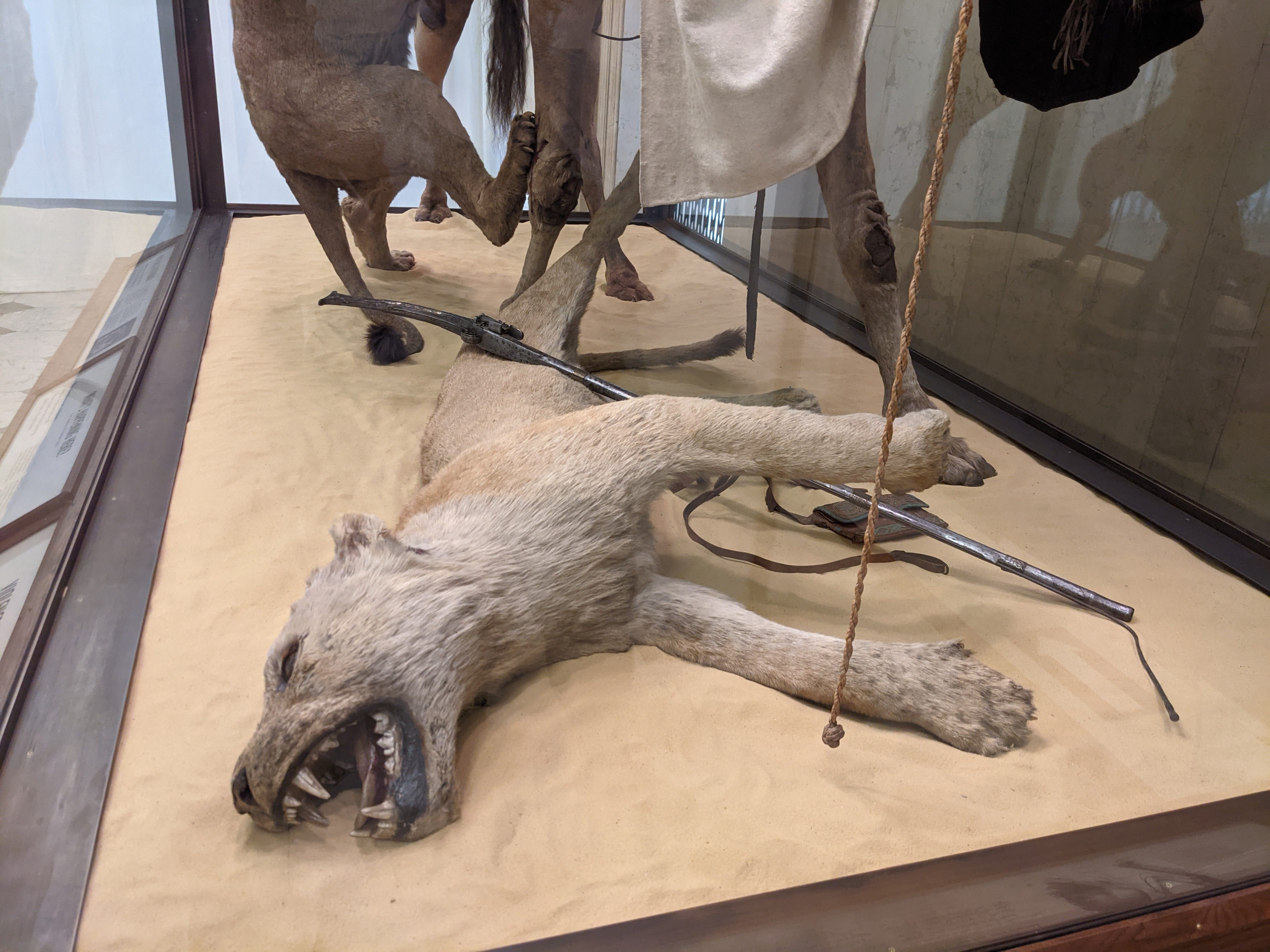
The female lion with a long gun over its torso

Lion Attacking a Dromedary is a taxidermied diorama. It appears, to the viewer, as a frozen moment in time that could be reanimated momentarily. It depicts an imagined violent scene, a North African courier on a dromedary struggling for his life. The camel is bellowing in pain as a male Barbary lion is trying to climb up it to reach the courier who is attempting to stab the lion with his knife. The body of a female lion lies in front of the camel, dead from the courier's single shot; his long gun lies across the lioness. The male figure, referred to as an Arab by Verreaux, is a fictional pastiche of five North African cultures and is based on what Verreaux thought an Arab looked like.

The diorama broke from the earlier trend of displaying taxidermy mounts individually on pedestals and lining them up in a row, instead this work depicted multiple specimens interacting with active and dynamic poses. The composition has changed over time leading to different interpretations, originally the Arab was situated higher up on the camel making the fight seem tense but survivable, however after the Arab was positioned lower it gave the impression he was falling off and facing imminent defeat.

== Exhibition in Pittsburgh ==
In 1898, Lion Attacking a Dromedary was sold to the Carnegie Museum of Natural History for $50 (equivalent to $1,935 in 2025) and cost $45 (equivalent to $1,742 in 2025) to be shipped to Pittsburgh due to the diorama's size. The work was considered to be "too theatrical" to be displayed at the American Museum of Natural History. The next year, Frederick Webster restored the diorama. During Webster's restoration, the museum made several changes. Due to a crack in the camel's neck, the position of the male figure was changed to be off of the saddle as is seen today. The museum purchased an Arabian flintlock long gun from an antiques dealer in Pittsburgh and added it to the piece at this time.

After the restoration, the piece went on display. From 1899 until 2016, Lion Attacking a Dromedary was shown at the Carnegie Museum of Natural History in five different locations around the museum. Early labels for the piece showed the dramatic stories that could be written about it instead of the educational value. In the 1980s, it was moved to the Hall of African Wildlife where it was shown with traditional natural dioramas. In 2009, the museum made a snow globe depicting the group. Instead of the traditional snow, the museum had gold leaf pieces to make it look like the figures were in a sandstorm.

=== Second restoration ===
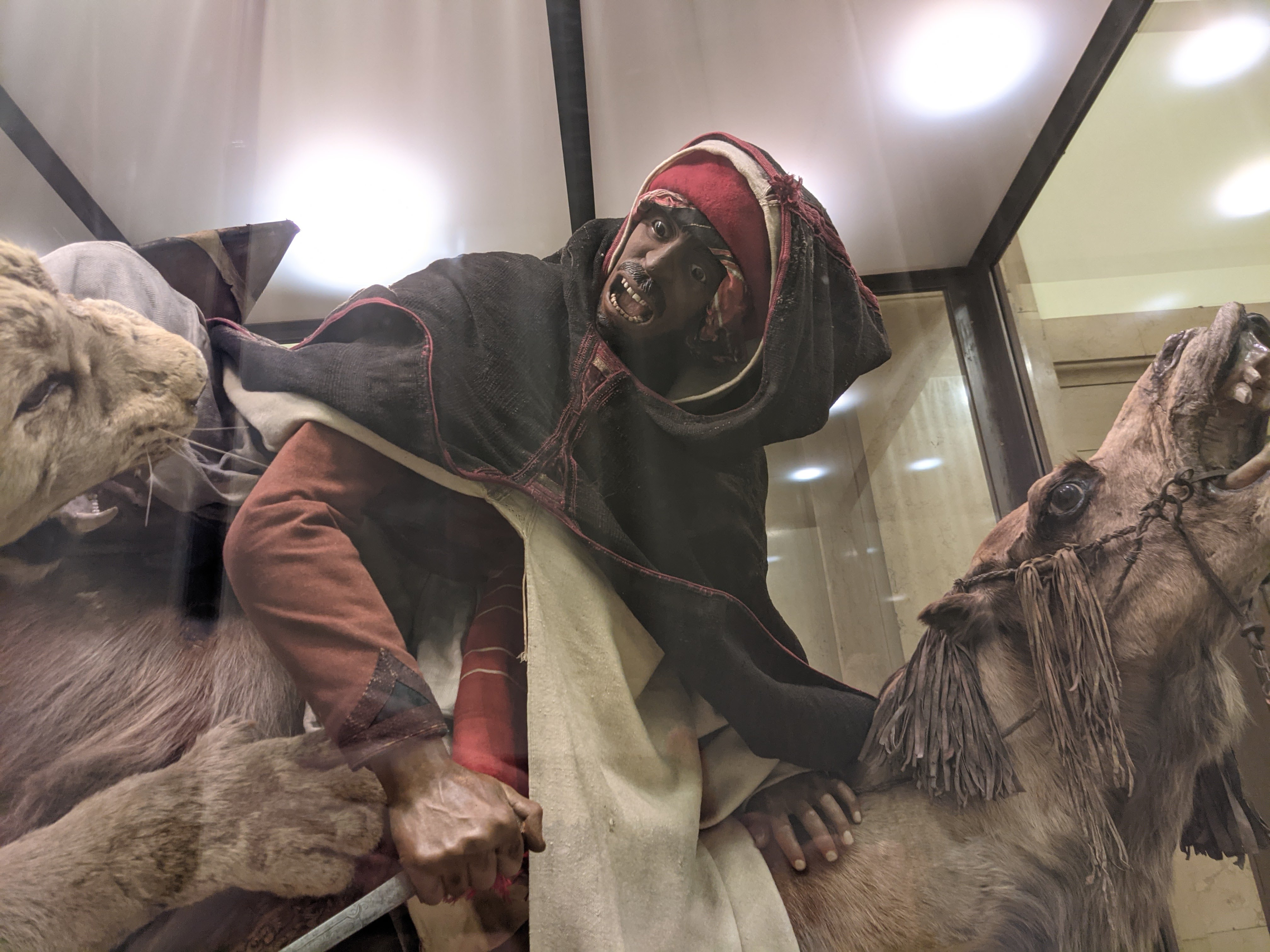
Male figure that contains a human skull

In 2016, Lion Attacking a Dromedary was restored by the museum for a second time. As part of the restoration, the museum conducted tests on the animals using X-rays and DNA analysis techniques of the taxidermied animals to determine if they were genuine. Verreaux was known to fake records to inflate the selling price of his dioramas. The human figure was determined to be mostly synthetic, but, to the surprise of the museum, the head contained a human skull. It is unknown to whom the skull belongs or from where Verreaux collected the skull. Previously, it was thought that the human figure was only made of plaster, but there was some speculation that the Arab was either fully or partially made with human remains in the diorama. When asked about the chances of there being human remains in the male figure in 2009, the museum denied it was a possibility stating that "European sensibilities would not have embraced an exhibit that used human parts, even in 1867".

In January 2017, the diorama went back on display in the foyer of the museum, after the museum rejected a proposal to move the diorama to the Carnegie Museum of Art and show it with other orientalist art. While the piece was moved, the name was changed from Arab Courier Attacked by Lions to Lion Attacking a Dromedary to better contextualize the piece. As a part of the unveiling, the Carnegie Museum of Natural History hosted a symposium about the restoration, the diorama, and its misrepresentation of North Africa.

=== Recontextualization and removal ===
In July 2020, the Carnegie Museum of Natural History removed Lion Attacking a Dromedary from view citing the Black Lives Matter movement and the lack of accuracy. Patrons were given a choice to view the diorama behind a curtain starting in September 2020 and the museum considered moving the diorama to a part of the museum where it could be avoided. That remained the status quo until July 2021 when Lion Attacking a Dromedary was returned to public view with additional context. The decision to do so was made because, according to the museum's director "I think the curtains were more harmful than not having them up at all". In October 2023 the museum adopted a new policy regarding the display of human remains. Because the diorama has a human skull in it the museum has removed the exhibit from public display. There are efforts being made to determine the origin of the skull and repatriate the remains. The diorama was dismantled later that month with the museum's director stating that a replica would not be made for racial reasons.

== Reception ==
Lion Attacking a Dromedary was created to celebrate the French colonial empire and uses orientalist tropes. The diorama is inaccurate both scientifically and anthropologically and is considered to be a work of fiction. Anthropologists, zoologists, and museum studies commentators have been critical of the piece since the 1890s. The Smithsonian Institution questioned the propriety of showing such a sensationalist diorama in 1892. Lion Attacking a Dromedary was removed from the American Museum of Natural History in 1898 and they considered destroying it because the museum felt that the diorama was "too emotional and distracting for educational purposes." Frederic Augustus Lucas defended Lion Attacking a Dromedary in 1914 from criticism of being overly theatrical by pointing out that by being theatrical the piece was interesting and drew the attention of museum patrons. By 2002, the diorama was seen as an example of "danger, excitement, and exoticism" of the other in orientalist works and was compared to a "sideshow attraction." Lion Attacking a Dromedary is considered to be Verreaux's masterpiece by journalist Miquel Molina in an article in Pula: Botswana Journal of African Studies. Art Historian Louise Lippincott has said the diorama helped to prove taxidermy was an artform.
