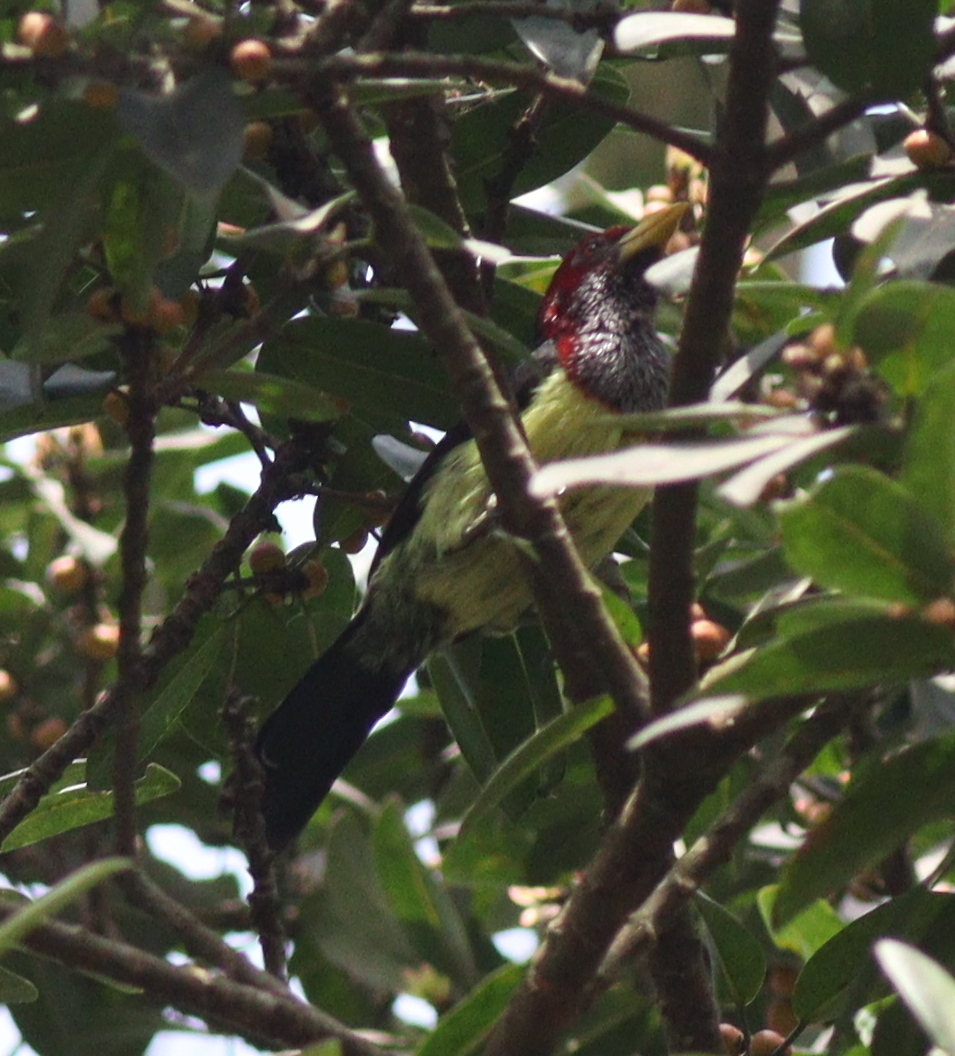

Conservation status
- Least Concern (IUCN 3.1)

Scientific classification
- Kingdom: Animalia
- Phylum: Chordata
- Class: Aves
- Order: Piciformes
- Family: Lybiidae
- Genus: Trachylaemus
- Species: T. goffinii

Binomial name
- Trachylaemus goffinii (Goffin, 1863)

= Western yellow-billed barbet =

Species of bird

The western yellow-billed barbet (Trachylaemus goffinii) is a species of bird in the African barbet family Lybiidae that is found from Sierra Leone to southwest Nigeria in West Africa. The species was formerly considered to be conspecific with the eastern yellow-billed barbet.

== Taxonomy ==
The western yellow-billed barbet was formally described in 1863 by the Dutch army officer and ornithologist Andreas Leopold August Goffin (1837–1863) under the binomial name Capito goffinii. The specimens had been collected by Cornelis Nagtglas in the Dutch Gold Coast (now part of Ghana). (Note: Although Goffin lists the species as "Capito goffinii Schlegel, in Mus. Batav.", there is no evidence that Hermann Schlegel was responsible for the description.) The western yellow-billed barbet is now placed with the eastern yellow-billed barbet in the genus Trachylaemus that was introduced in 1891 by the German ornithologist Anton Reichenow. This species was formerly considered to be conspecific with the eastern yellow-billed barbet with the common name "yellow-billed barbet". The western yellow-billed barbet is now considered to be a separate species based on the differences in morphology and the deep mitochondrial DNA divergence.

Two subspecies are recognised:

- T. g. goffinii (Goffin, 1863) – Sierra Leone to Ghana
- T. g. togoensis (Reichenow, 1891) – Togo to southwest Nigeria
