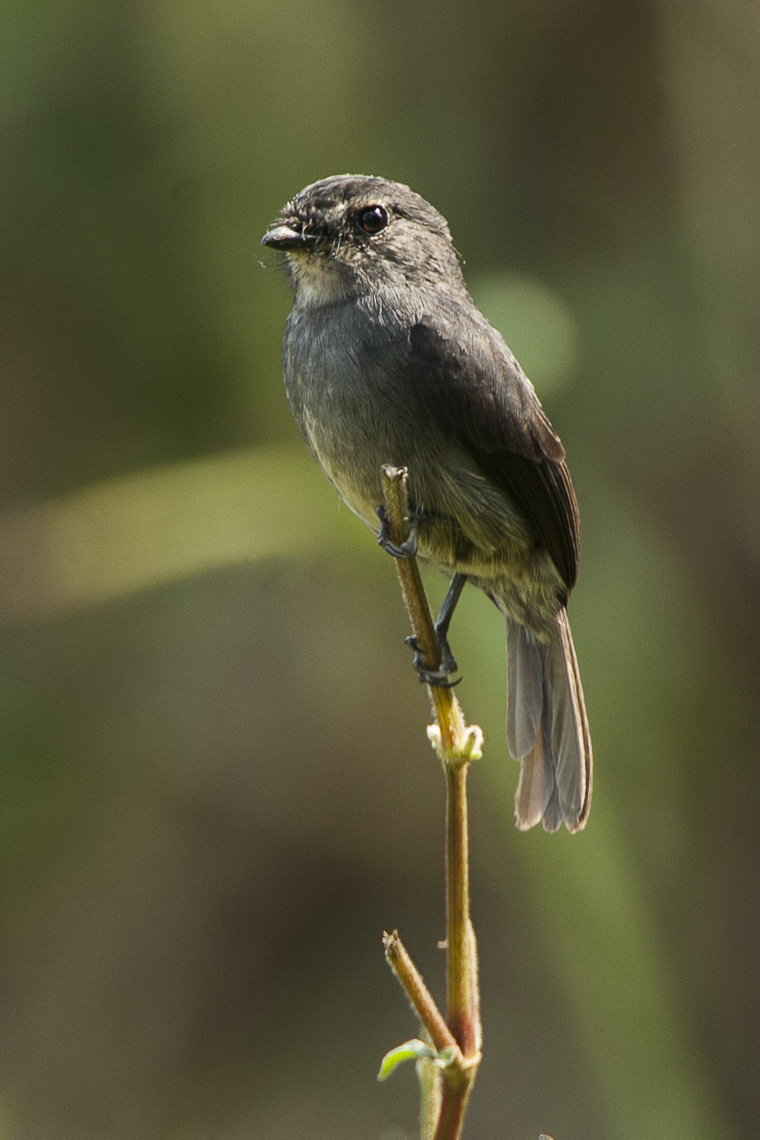
- Bradornis comitatus comitatus, Uganda

Conservation status
- Least Concern (IUCN 3.1)

Scientific classification
- Kingdom: Animalia
- Phylum: Chordata
- Class: Aves
- Order: Passeriformes
- Family: Muscicapidae
- Genus: Bradornis
- Species: B. comitatus

Binomial name
- Bradornis comitatus (Cassin, 1857)

Synonyms
- Muscicapa comitata

= Dusky-blue flycatcher =

Species of bird

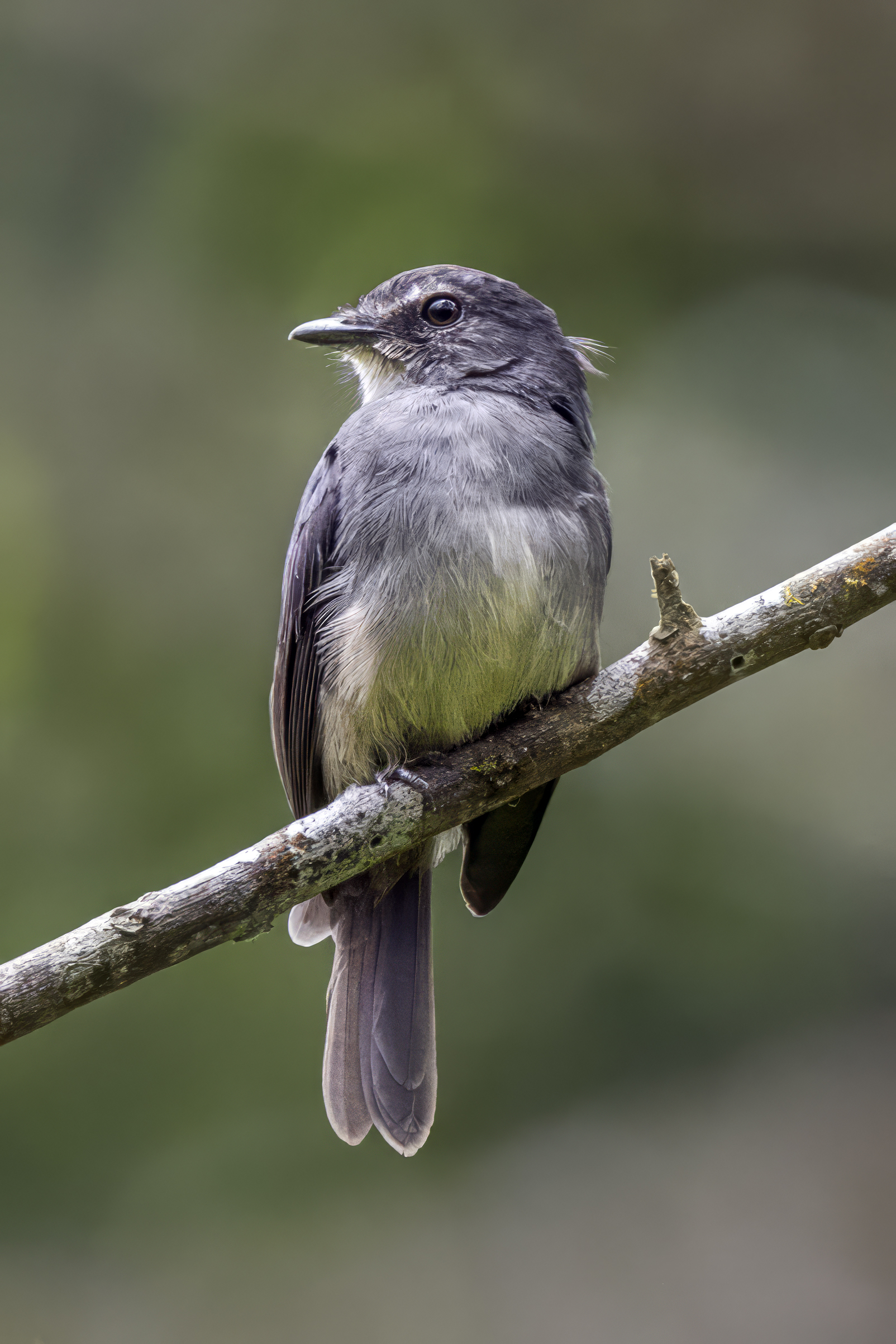
Bradornis comitatus aximensis, Ghana

The dusky-blue flycatcher (Bradornis comitatus) is a species of bird in the family Muscicapidae. It has a wide range of presence across the African tropical rainforest. Its natural habitat is subtropical or tropical moist lowland forests.
