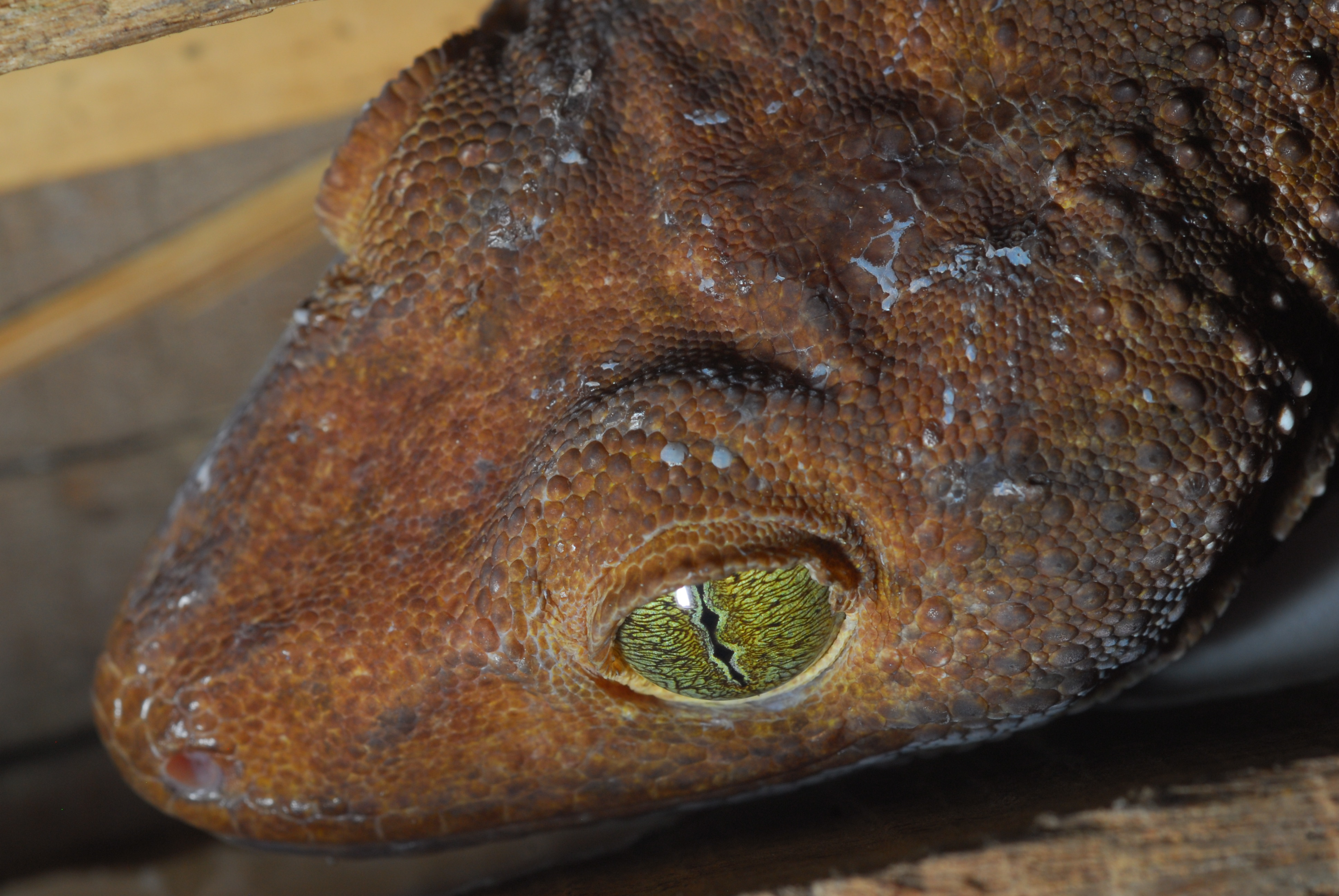
- A closer look at the eye

Scientific classification
- Kingdom: Animalia
- Phylum: Chordata
- Class: Reptilia
- Order: Squamata
- Suborder: Gekkota
- Family: Gekkonidae
- Genus: Gekko
- Species: G. verreauxi

Binomial name
- Gekko verreauxi Tytler, 1865

= Andaman giant gecko =

Species of lizard

The Andaman giant gecko (Gekko verreauxi), also known commonly as the Andamanese giant gecko, is a species of lizard in the family Gekkonidae. The species is indigenous to the Andaman Islands and the neighboring Nicobar Islands.

== Etymology ==
The specific name, verreauxi, is in honor of French naturalist Jules Verreaux.

== Geographic range ==
G. verreauxi is endemic to the Andaman Islands of India.

== Description ==
Reaching a total length (including tail) of more than one foot (30 cm), the Andaman giant gecko is one of the world's largest geckos.

== Habitat ==
G. verreauxi is commonly found on trees, tree logs, and in crop fields.

== Behaviour ==
G. verreauxi hides by day in cavities or under bark plates of trees (typically Manilkara litoralis), and comes out after sunset to prey on insects. It is shy and well camouflaged.

== Reproduction ==
G. verreauxi is oviparous.

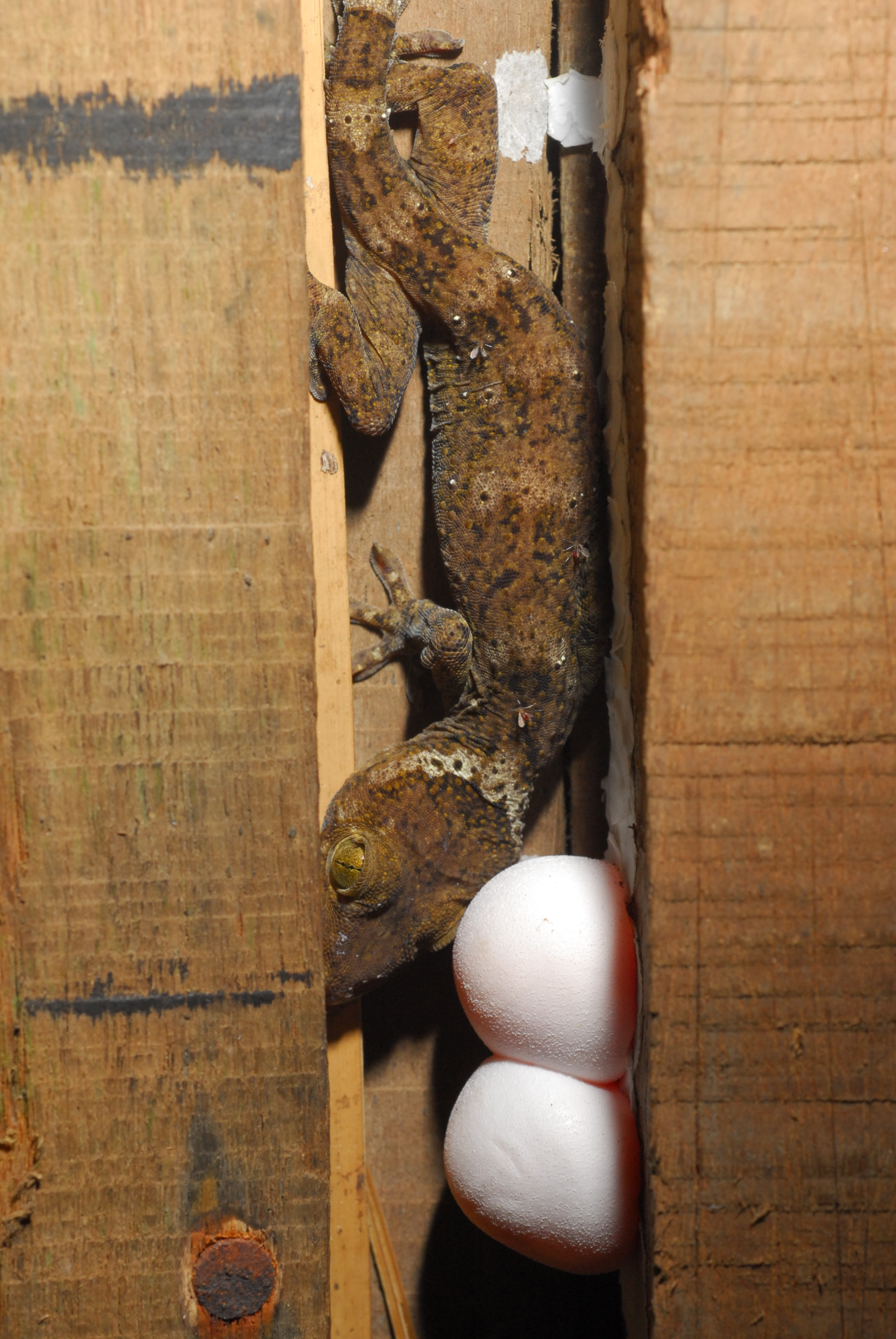
A Gekko verreauxi guards a clutch of eggs
