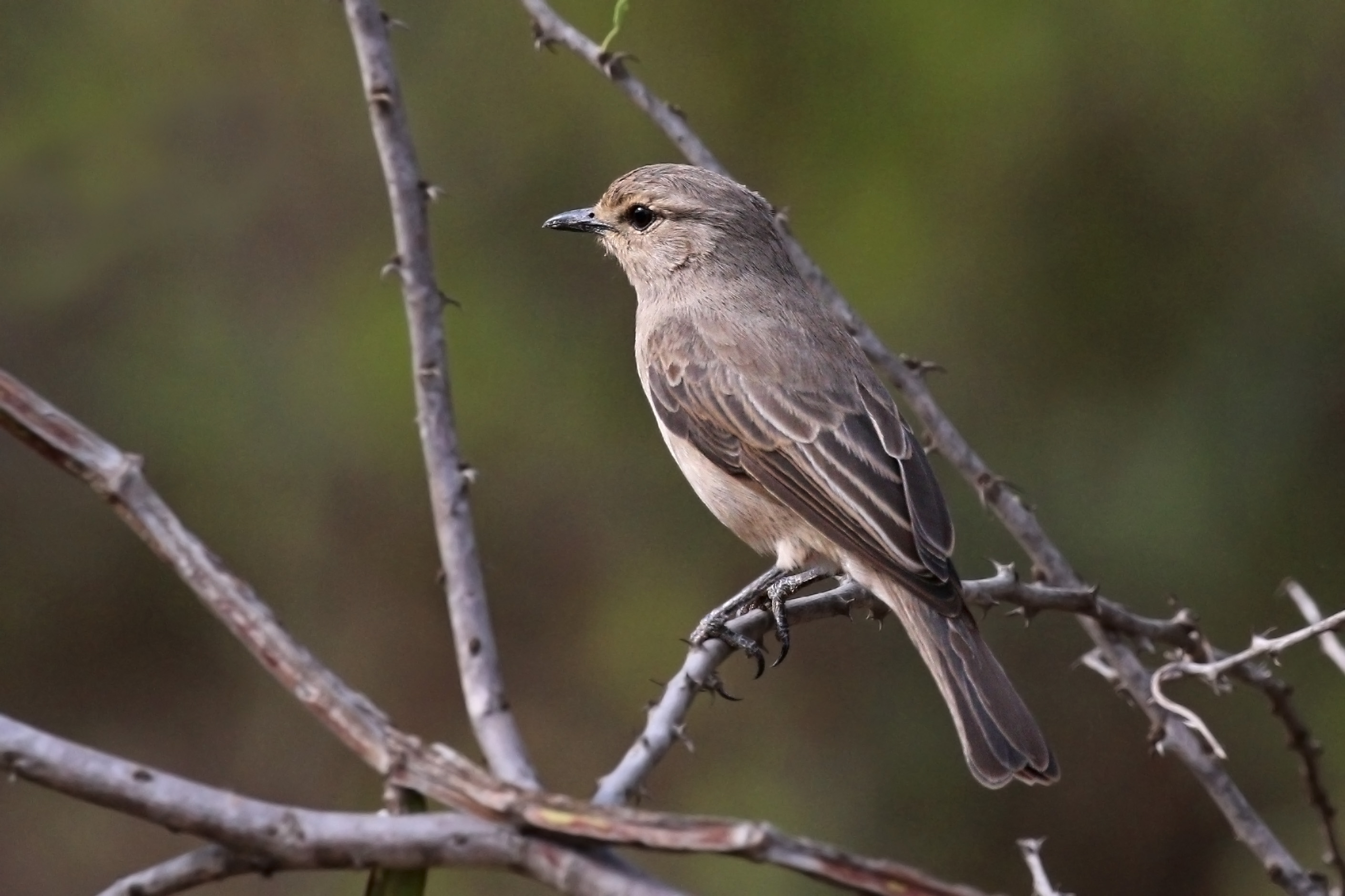
- Lake Baringo, Kenya

Conservation status
- Least Concern (IUCN 3.1)

Scientific classification
- Kingdom: Animalia
- Phylum: Chordata
- Class: Aves
- Order: Passeriformes
- Family: Muscicapidae
- Genus: Bradornis
- Species: B. microrhynchus

Binomial name
- Bradornis microrhynchus Reichenow, 1887

Synonyms
- Melaenornis microrhynchus

= African grey flycatcher =

Species of bird

The African grey flycatcher, grayish flycatcher, or large flycatcher (Bradornis microrhynchus) is a passerine bird in the Old World flycatcher family Muscicapidae that occurs in parts of East Africa.

== Taxonomy ==
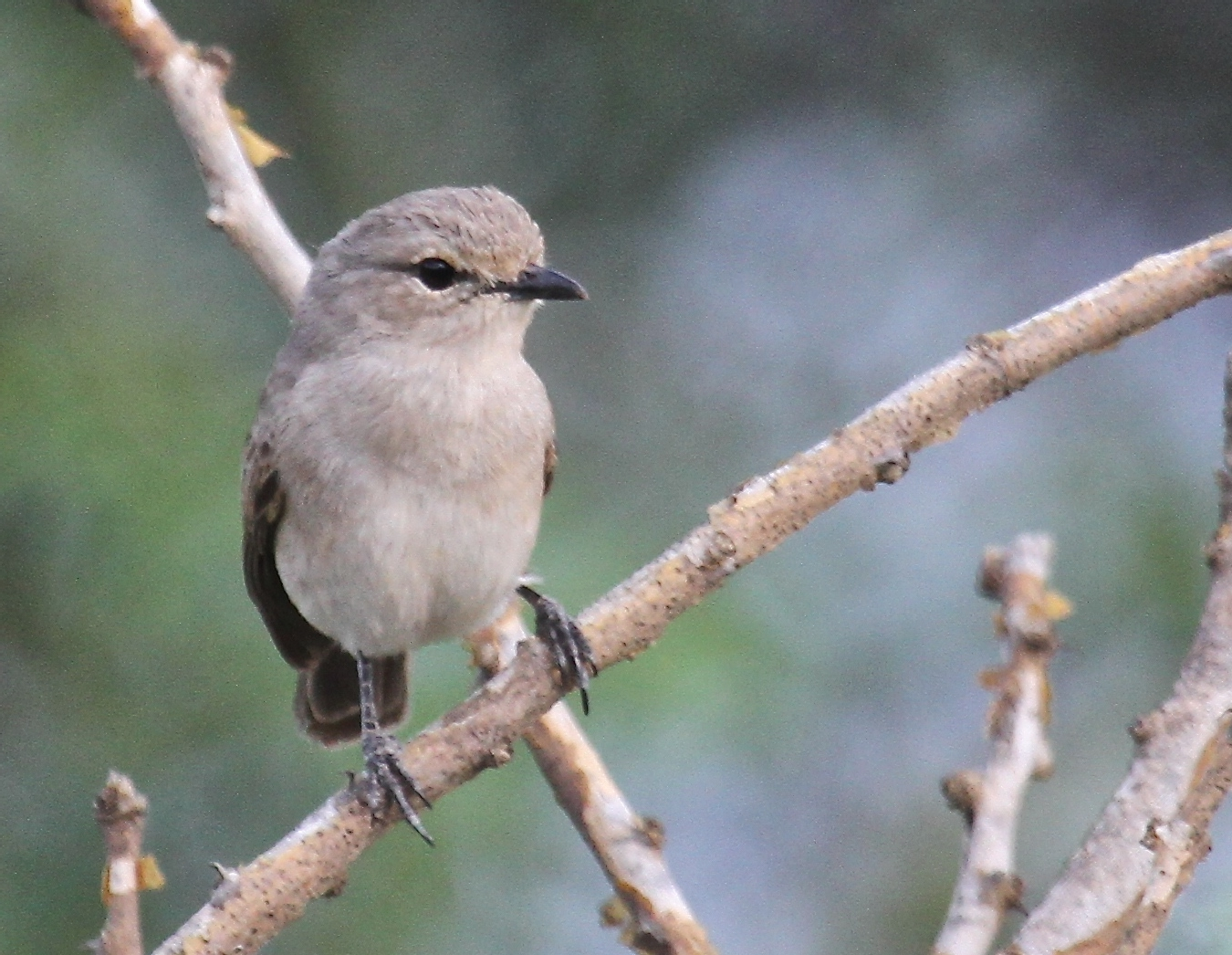
Lake Bogoria - Kenya

The African grey flycatcher was previously placed in the genus Melaenornis but was moved to Bradornis based on the results of a molecular phylogenetic study published in 2010. The subspecies B. m. pumilus is sometimes considered a full species, the Ethiopian grey flycatcher (Bradornis pumilus).

== Distribution and habitat ==
It is found in Ethiopia, Kenya, Somalia, South Sudan, Tanzania, and Uganda. Its natural habitats are dry savanna and subtropical or tropical dry shrubland.
