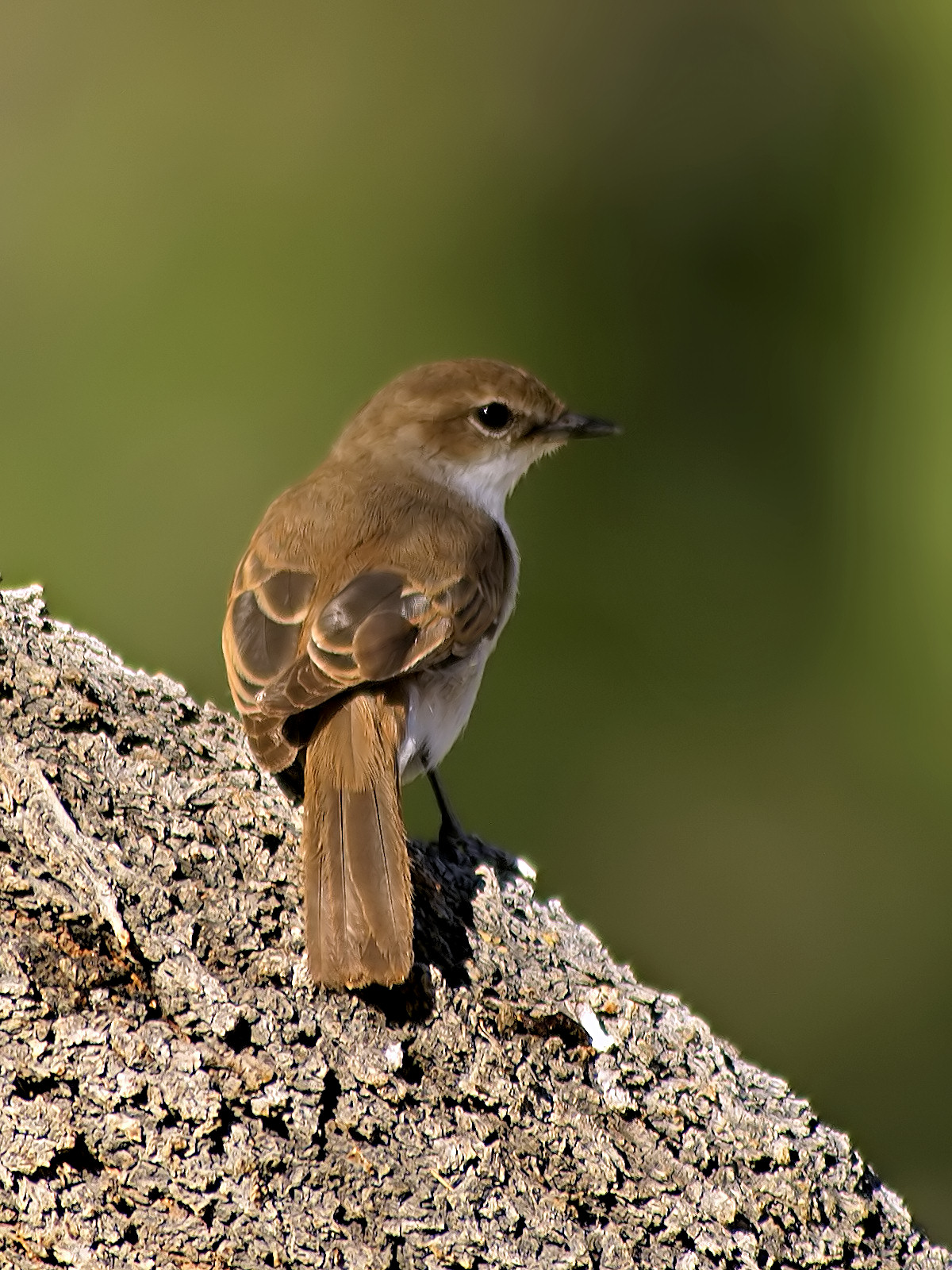
- M. m. acaciae in Etosha, Namibia

Conservation status
- Least Concern (IUCN 3.1)

Scientific classification
- Kingdom: Animalia
- Phylum: Chordata
- Class: Aves
- Order: Passeriformes
- Family: Muscicapidae
- Genus: Bradornis
- Species: B. mariquensis

Binomial name
- Bradornis mariquensis Smith, 1847

Synonyms
- Melaenornis mariquensis

= Marico flycatcher =

Species of bird

The Marico flycatcher or Mariqua flycatcher (Bradornis mariquensis) is a passerine bird in the Old World flycatcher family Muscicapidae that is found in areas of southern Africa.

== Taxonomy ==
The Marico flycatcher was previously placed in the genus Bradornis but was moved to Melaenornis based on the results of a molecular phylogenetic study published in 2010.

== Range ==
It is found in Angola, Botswana, Namibia, South Africa, Zambia and Zimbabwe.

== Habitat ==
Its natural habitat is dry savanna.
