= Francesc Darder =

Spanish veterinarian and physician (1851–1918)

Francesc d'Assís Darder i Llimona
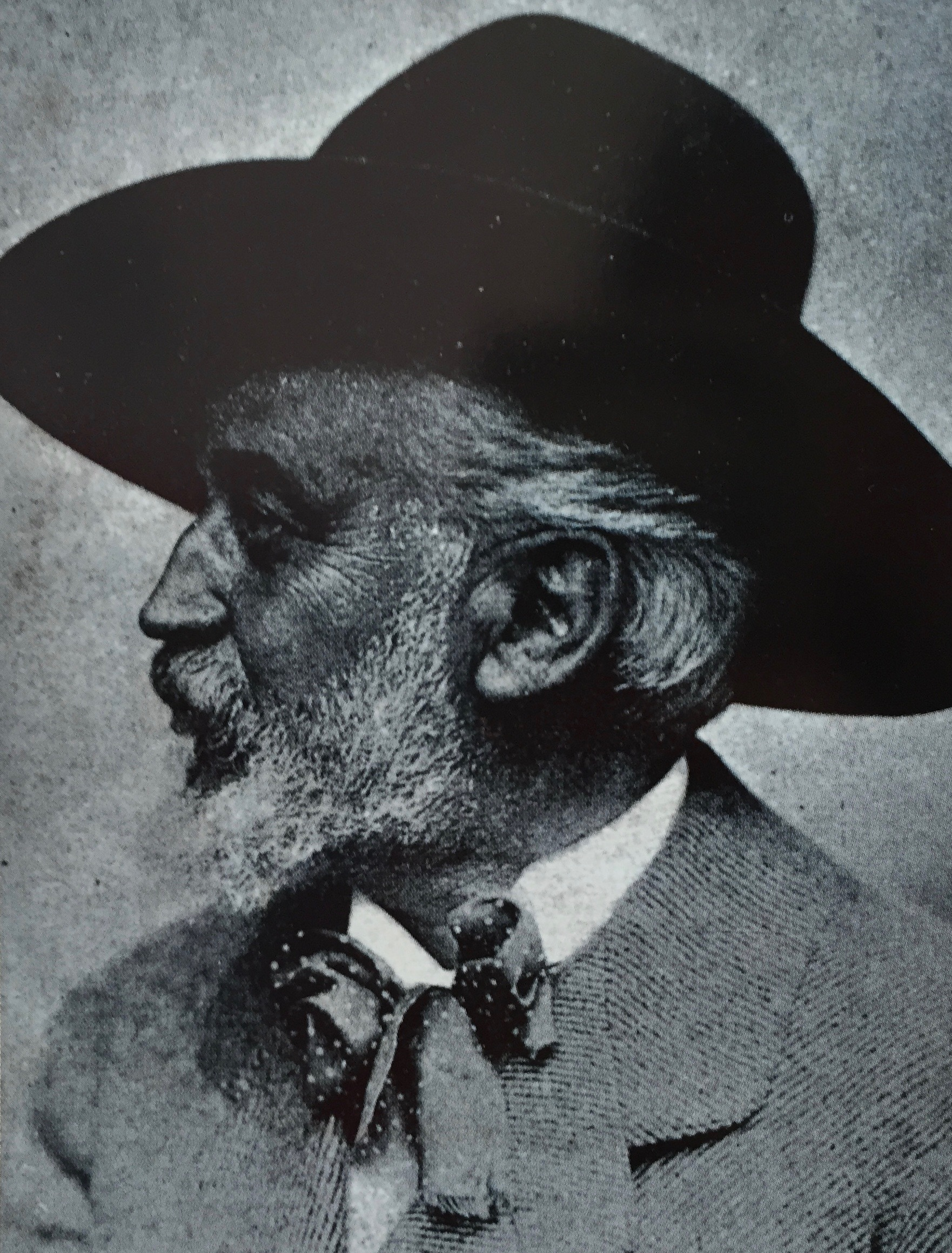
- Born: 2 October 1851; Barcelona, Spain
- Died: 1918; Barcelona, Spain
- Cause of death: Snakebite
- Occupations: Veterinarian, physician, taxidermist, zoologist
- Spouse: Joaquima Rodés i Bosch
- Children: Jeroni, Paquita, Pere, Joan Baptista
- Parent(s): Jeroni Darder y Feliu; Carme Llimona i Junoy

Francesc d'Assís Darder i Llimona (Barcelona, 2 October 1851 – Barcelona, 1918), better known as Francesc Darder, was a Spanish veterinarian and physician. He practised his profession while complementing it with his passion for natural history, collecting, and taxidermy, which drove him to open a shop dedicated to the dissemination and pedagogy of naturalism and, subsequently, to found zoos and museums.

== Biography ==
He was the son of Jeroni Darder y Feliu (Barcelona, 1804 – 1 February 1889), a veterinary inspector at the Barcelona slaughterhouse, and Carme Llimona i Junoy. (Note: In the birth registration, he appears as Dardé.) The grandson of veterinarians on his father's side, he was the brother of Antoni Darder i Llimona (Barcelona, 1858–1917), who researched trichina and presided over the Official College of Veterinarians of Barcelona. He married Joaquima Rodés i Bosch (1852–1937) in 1875, (Note: Daughter of industrialist Gaspar Rodés i Planas (d. 1877) and Rosa Bosch i Cuneny (d. 1882).) with whom he had four children: Jeroni, Paquita, Pere, and Joan Baptista Darder Rodés (Barcelona, 1887–1944), a pulmonologist.

He completed his secondary education at the Instituto de Gracia. At eighteen, he moved to Madrid and entered the School of Veterinary Medicine, combining his studies with compulsory military service. In June 1873, he obtained the title of first-class veterinarian. Later, he began studying medicine at the University of Barcelona and took up taxidermy studies.

After graduating, he joined the family business with his father. To expand it, he sold animal collections and teaching materials for educational centres, frequently travelling to Paris and London to acquire live animals and collections from their acclimatisation gardens. In 1880, he opened a new establishment on Aldana Street called “El conejar modelo barcelonés” (The Model Barcelona Rabbit Warren), dedicated to supplying materials for cuniculture and promoting the sale of articles for rabbit breeding.

He held the position of Sub-delegate for Veterinary Health of Barcelona until 1889. In 1887, he was appointed secretary of the Board of Directors of the Barcelona Society for the Protection of Animals and Plants, and in 1888, he participated in the organising committee of the International Congress of Natural Sciences, held during the Universal Exhibition. He directed various specialised publications: in 1876, he began editing El Zookeryx, a weekly magazine on zootechnical exploitation and hunting, which became Revista Universal Ilustrada between 1878 and 1880, and later founded El Naturalista.

In 1890, he had a building constructed in Gràcia, designed by the architect Joan Feu i Puig, to house the Darder Museum of Natural History, where he grouped his public collections, offices, and taxidermy laboratory. In 1892, he founded the Barcelona Zoo and became its first director. To provide the zoo with spectacular animals, he walked from Genoa to Barcelona accompanying an elephant bought from a circus, named Aví, and brought camels from Algiers, with the intention of housing them in spacious enclosures in the empty pavilions of the Parc de la Ciutadella. During his time as director, he collaborated with Salvador Castelló and Lluís Martí-Codolar in the selection and popularisation of the Prat breed of chicken. However, his methods and exhibitionist tendencies caused tension with the Barcelona Academy of Sciences, which ultimately led to his departure from the zoo.

In the field of ichthyology, he inaugurated the “Laboratori ictiogènic” at the Barcelona Zoo in 1909 to breed native and exotic species for the repopulation of Catalan rivers and lakes, introducing species from Asia and America such as the goldfish, the Russian green tench, and the rainbow trout. In the summer of 1910, he visited Banyoles and, enthused by its lake, proposed a repopulation plan to the authorities. On 26 October 1910, he organised the “Festa del Peix” (Fish Festival), releasing thousands of fish into the lake. Due to the success of this initiative, the City Council named him an Adopted Son of the city. That same year, he founded the Barcelona Museum of Zoology.

== The “Negro” of Banyoles ==
In 1915, upon retiring from his work in Barcelona, Darder donated all his collections to the city of Banyoles, with which the Darder Museum was founded, opening on 22 October 1916. Among the numerous animal taxidermy pieces and ethnological objects, catalogue piece number 1004 stood out: the embalmed body of an individual of African origin, adorned with a spear, a shield, a feather headdress, and a loincloth, displayed under a plaque that read: “Bushman, or perhaps Bechuana, from the Kalahari”.

The individual had been dug up and desecrated in Africa in the mid-19th century by the brothers Jules and Edouard Verreaux, who embalmed him in Cape Town and sent him to the Maison Verreaux in Paris. After the shop closed in 1878, the piece was acquired by Darder, who was unaware of its illicit origin. In the Banyoles museum, the body was displayed in a glass case and underwent annual maintenance with shoe polish to counteract the fading caused by the arsenic used in its preservation.

The exhibition of human remains alongside animals went unnoticed until 1991, when Alphonse Arcelin, a Haitian-born doctor living in Cambrils, visited the museum and began a solitary campaign to denounce what he considered an act of racism. With the impending 1992 Summer Olympics in Barcelona, whose canoeing events were to be held on the Lake of Banyoles, Arcelin asked international figures such as Nelson Mandela, Desmond Tutu, and Kofi Annan, as well as the African Union, to promote a boycott. This led the Government of Spain to pressure the Banyoles City Council to remove the piece from display, although some of the local population opposed this with slogans such as “The Negro is cultural heritage for us”.

Finally, in response to repatriation demands from the African Union, the Spanish government decided to return the remains to Africa. The body was secretly transferred to the National Museum of Anthropology in Madrid, where the skeletal remains were separated from the stuffing and skin, to hide the continuous applications of shoe polish. In October 2000, a coffin containing only the skull and some bones arrived in Gaborone, the capital of Botswana. The remains were buried in Tsholofelo Park without traditional ceremonies, marking the end of a prolonged international controversy.

In the final years of his life, he worked as a professor of zoology at the Higher School of Agriculture. Francesc Darder died in 1918 as a result of a snakebite. His son Jeroni succeeded him as the director of the Barcelona Zoo, a position he held until his retirement in 1931.

== Works ==
- Hidrofobia: su definición, sinonimia, síntomas, etiología, contagio, tratamiento, anatomía patológica, policía sanitaria y rabia muda. Impr. de Jaime Jepús (1876).
- Utilidad e importancia de la cría, multiplicación, conservación y mejora de los animales domésticos. Fomento de la Producción Nacional (1877).
- Sexo a voluntad. Imp. de Henrich y C.ª en comandita, sucesores de N. Ramírez y C.ª (1893).
- Manual práctico de veterinaria doméstica. Imp. de Henrich y C.ª en comandita, sucesores de N. Ramírez y C.ª.
- Manual práctico para la cría de las ocas: medio fácil de lograr una renta anual de 3.000 pesetas. Imp. de Henrich y C.ª en comandita, sucesores de N. Ramírez y C.ª.
- El Conejo, la liebre y el lepórido: manual práctico de la cría y multiplicación de dichos roedores, descripción de todas las razas, enfermedades y su tratamiento. Librería de Francisco Puig (1910).
- Cría industrial de la trucha. Imp. Hijos de D. Casanovas (1913).
- Crónica piscatoria: documentos oficiales, artículos, informaciones, notas técnicas, capturas importantes, noticias útiles, datos estadísticos [...]. Imp. Hijos de D. Casanovas (1913).
- Reproducció de la truita: concells als piscicultors debutants: conferencia [...]. Imp. Hijos de D. Casanovas (1913).
- Piscicultura industrial: conferències donades a Ripoll amb motiu de celebrar-se en dita vila la festa del peix. Impr. Heurich (1915).

== See also ==
- Darder Museum
- Negro of Banyoles

== Bibliography ==
- Sanz Egaña, C. (1941). Historia de la Veterinaria Española. Madrid: Espasa-Calpe.
- Buch i Parera, J. (1989). "Una nissaga de veterinaris, els Darder". Mai Enrera (426): 22–24.
- "Un ilustre veí gracienc: en Francesc d'A. Darder". Mai Enrera (427): 23–25. 1989.
- Roca i Torras, J. (1992). Historia de la Veterinaria en Cataluña (1400-1980). Doctoral thesis. Barcelona: Autonomous University of Barcelona.
- Mendizábal Aizpuru, J. A. (2003). "Francesc d'Asís Darder i Llimona. El profesor naturalista". Arte Avícola (55): 22.
