= Pula (journal) =

- Discipline: African studies
- Language: English

Publication details
- History: 1978; 47 years ago – present
- Publisher: University of Botswana (Botswana)

Standard abbreviations
- ISO 4: Pula

Indexing
- ISSN: 0256-2316

Links
- Journal homepage; Online archive

Pula: Botswana Journal of African Studies, established in 1978, is a peer-reviewed academic journal covering studies on Africa, especially Southern Africa.

In 2006 Pula was one of a group of African journals selected by Michigan State University's "African e-Journals Project" to be digitized and placed online. Only articles up to 2003 are currently available from that archive, but an online version is available beginning with the 2012 issues.
