= Frank Westerman =

Dutch writer and former journalist

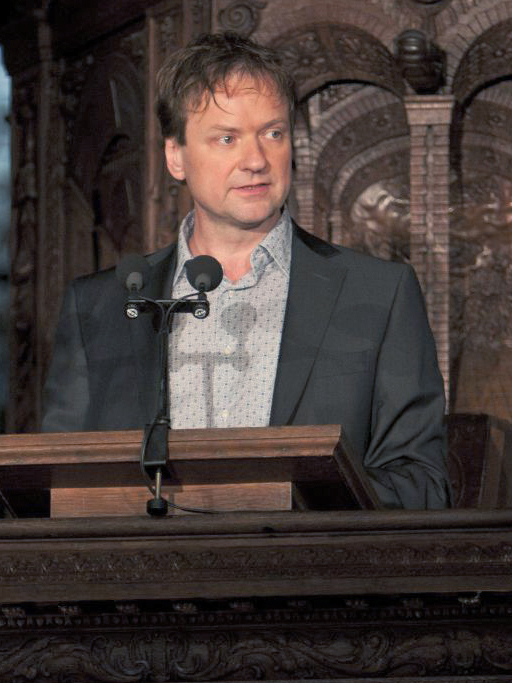
- Frank Westerman (2012)
- Born: Frank Martin Westerman; 13 November 1964 (age 61); Emmen, Netherlands
- Education: Wageningen University
- Occupations: Journalist, writer
- Writing career
- Language: Dutch
- Genre: Non-fiction
- Website: www.frankwesterman.nl/en

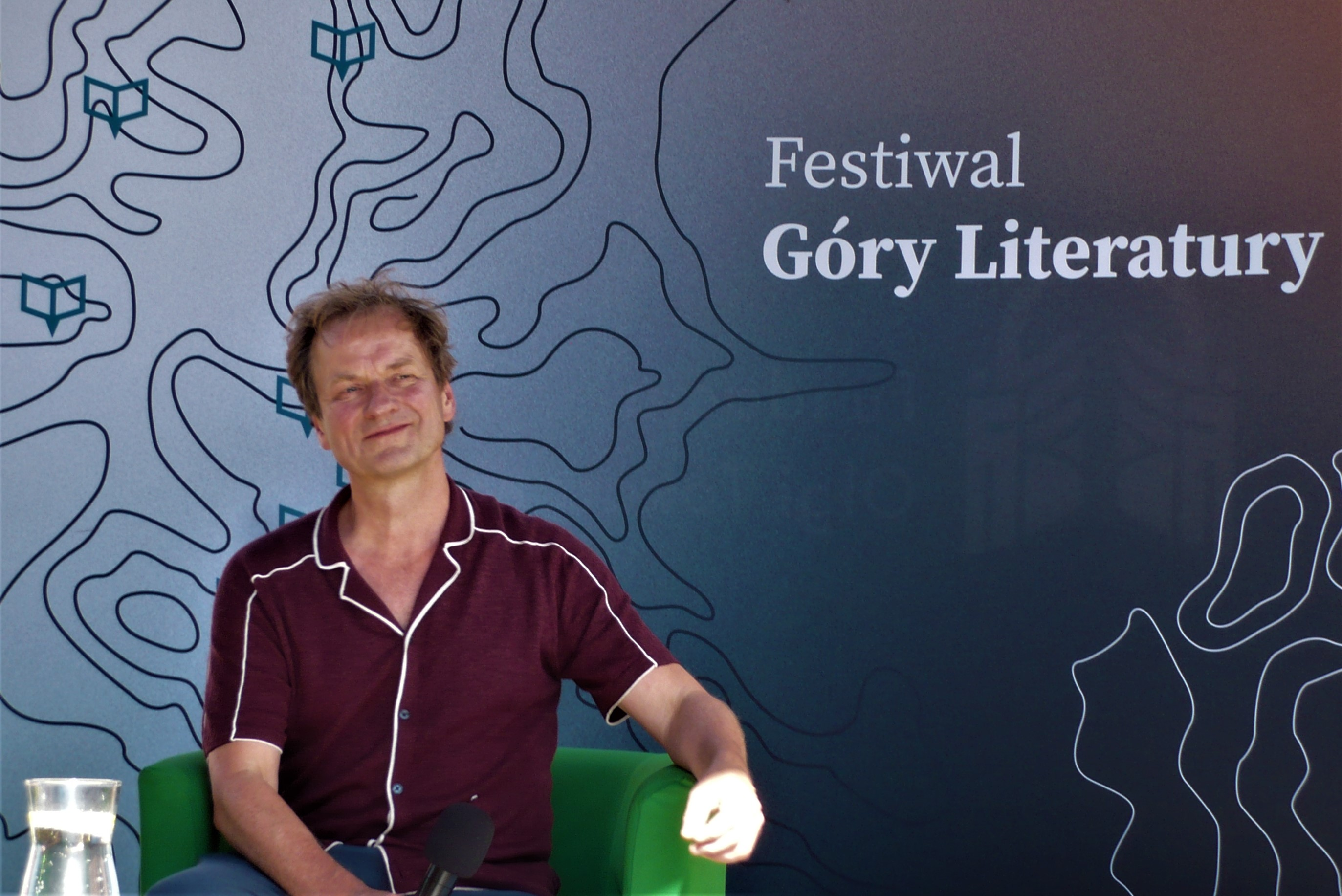
Frank Westerman, VIII Literary Heights Festival, Nowa Ruda (2022)

Frank Martin Westerman (born 13 November 1964) is a Dutch writer and a former journalist. He studied tropical agricultural engineering at Wageningen University and worked as a news correspondent for de Volkskrant in Belgrade and NRC Handelsblad in Moscow. He is currently a full-time writer of non-fiction books, among which are The Republic of Grain (1999), Engineers of the Soul (2002), and Ararat (2007).

== Life ==
Frank Martin Westerman was born on 13 November 1964 in Emmen in the Netherlands. He grew up in Assen, in a Christian-reformed family. Westerman studied tropical agricultural engineering at the Agricultural University of Wageningen. In 1987, he travelled to Peru, where he did research in Puno. In this period, he also started working as a journalist.

In 1992, he became correspondent of de Volkskrant in Belgrade. In 1995, Westerman and his colleague were two of the few journalists who were in Srebrenica during its capture. The book Srebrenica: The Blackest Scenario which they wrote using confidential UN documents and interviews with earwitnesses, aims to reconstruct the war and massacre in Srebrenica.

Between 1997 and 2002, Westerman was a correspondent of NRC Handelsblad in Moscow. As a journalist, he visited many places in the former Soviet Union. After a visit to Armenia in 1999, Westerman decided to climb Mount Ararat. His thoughts about this Biblical mountain, where – according to Christian, Muslim and Jewish beliefs – Noah's Ark landed, the memories and re-evaluation of his religious childhood, and his impressions of Armenia and Turkey are the main subjects of the book Ararat: In search of the mythical mountain (translated into English by Sam Garrett in 2008).

Currently, he is a full-time writer based in Amsterdam.

== Bibliography ==
Non-fiction

- (1994) De brug over de Tara; English translation: The Bridge over the Tara
- (1997) Het zwartste scenario; English translation: The Blackest Scenario, together with Bart Rijs
- (1999) De graanrepubliek; English translation: The Republic of Grain
- (2002) Ingenieurs van de ziel; English translation: Engineers of the Soul (2010)
- (2004) El Negro en ik; English translation: El Negro and Me
- (2007) Ararat; English translation: Ararat (2008)
- (2010) Dier, bovendier; English translation: Brother Mendel's Perfect Horse (2012)
- (2013) Stikvallei; English translation: Choke Valley
- (2016) Een woord een woord; English translation: A Word a Word
- (2018) Wij, de mens; English translation: We, Hominids: An Anthropological Detective Story (2021)

Fiction

- (2012) Larski slaat alarm; English translation: Larski Sounds the Alarm, together with his daughter Vera Westerman
