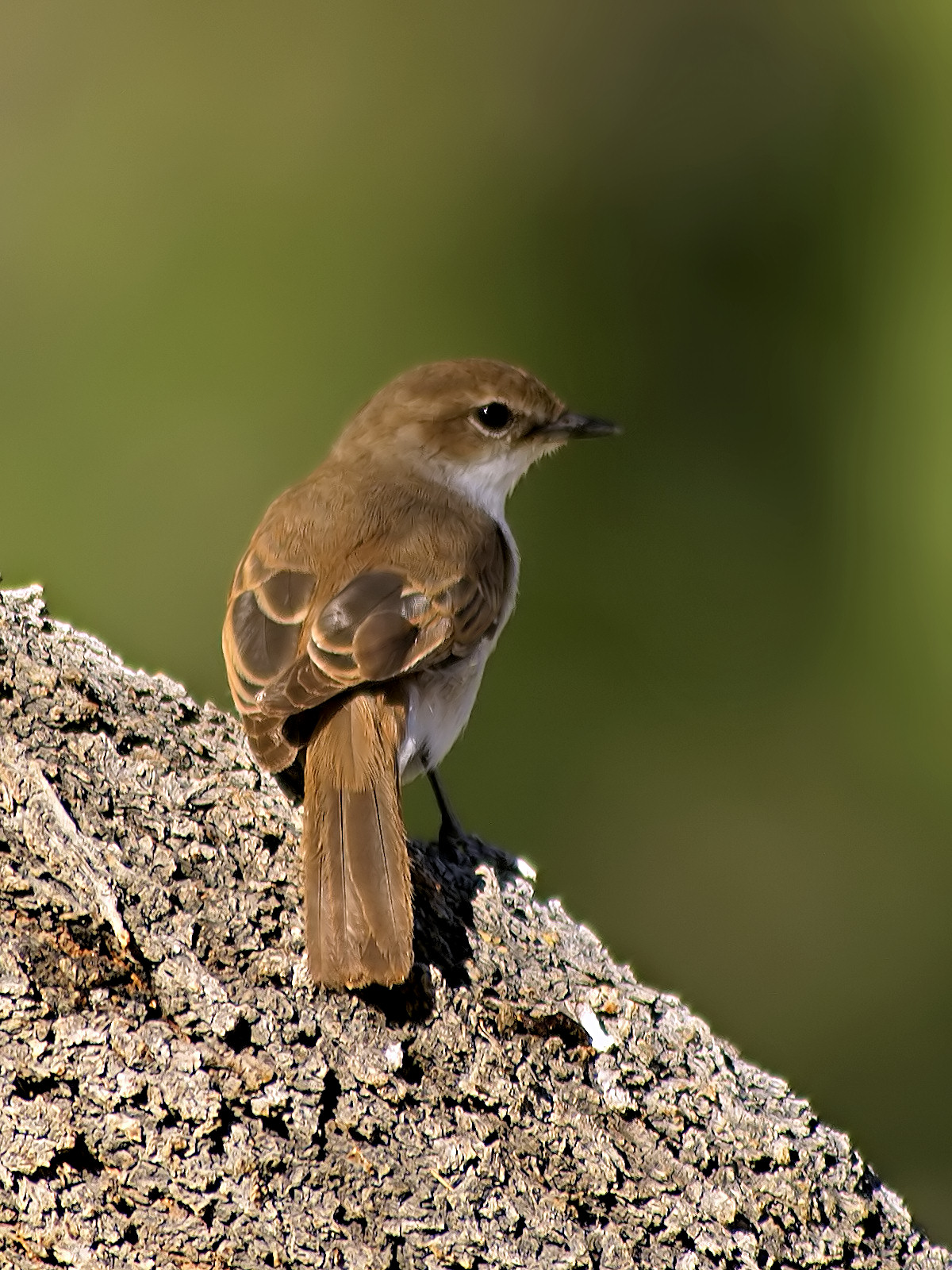
- Marico flycatcher (Bradornis mariquensis)

Scientific classification
- Kingdom: Animalia
- Phylum: Chordata
- Class: Aves
- Order: Passeriformes
- Family: Muscicapidae
- Genus: Bradornis; Smith, A, 1847

Type species
- Bradornis mariquensis Smith, A, 1847

= Bradornis =

Genus of birds

Bradornis is a genus of small passerine birds in the large family Muscicapidae commonly known as the Old World flycatchers. They are restricted to sub-Saharan Africa.

== Taxonomy ==
The genus Bradornis was introduced in 1847 by the Scottish zoologist Andrew Smith to accommodate a single species, the Marico flycatcher, which is therefore the type species. The genus name combines the Ancient Greek bradus meaning "slow" or "sluggish" and ornis meaning "bird". The genus Bradornis was resurrected to accommodate a clade of species from other genera based on molecular phylogenetic studies published in 2016 and 2023.

== Species ==
The genus contains three species:

Image	Common name	Scientific name	Distribution
	Dusky-blue flycatcher	Bradornis comitatus	Guineo-Congolian region
	African grey flycatcher	Bradornis microrhynchus	East Africa
	Marico flycatcher	Bradornis mariquensis	Kalahari Basin
