= Jules Verreaux =

French botanist and ornithologist (1807-1873)

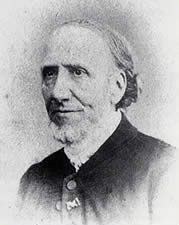
- Portrait from the 1860s
- Born: 24 August 1807; Paris
- Died: 7 September 1873 (aged 66); Paris
- Known for: Collection of natural history specimens
- Relatives: Édouard Verreaux (brother), Pierre Antoine Delalande (uncle)
- Scientific career
- Fields: Botany, ornithology
- Workplaces: Maison Verreaux, Place des Vosges, Paris
- Author abbrev. (zoology): J. Verreaux

Jules Pierre Verreaux ([vɛʁɔ]; 24 August 1807 – 7 September 1873) was a French botanist, ornithologist, grave-robber and a professional collector of and trader in natural history specimens. He was the brother of Édouard Verreaux and nephew of Pierre Antoine Delalande.

== Career ==
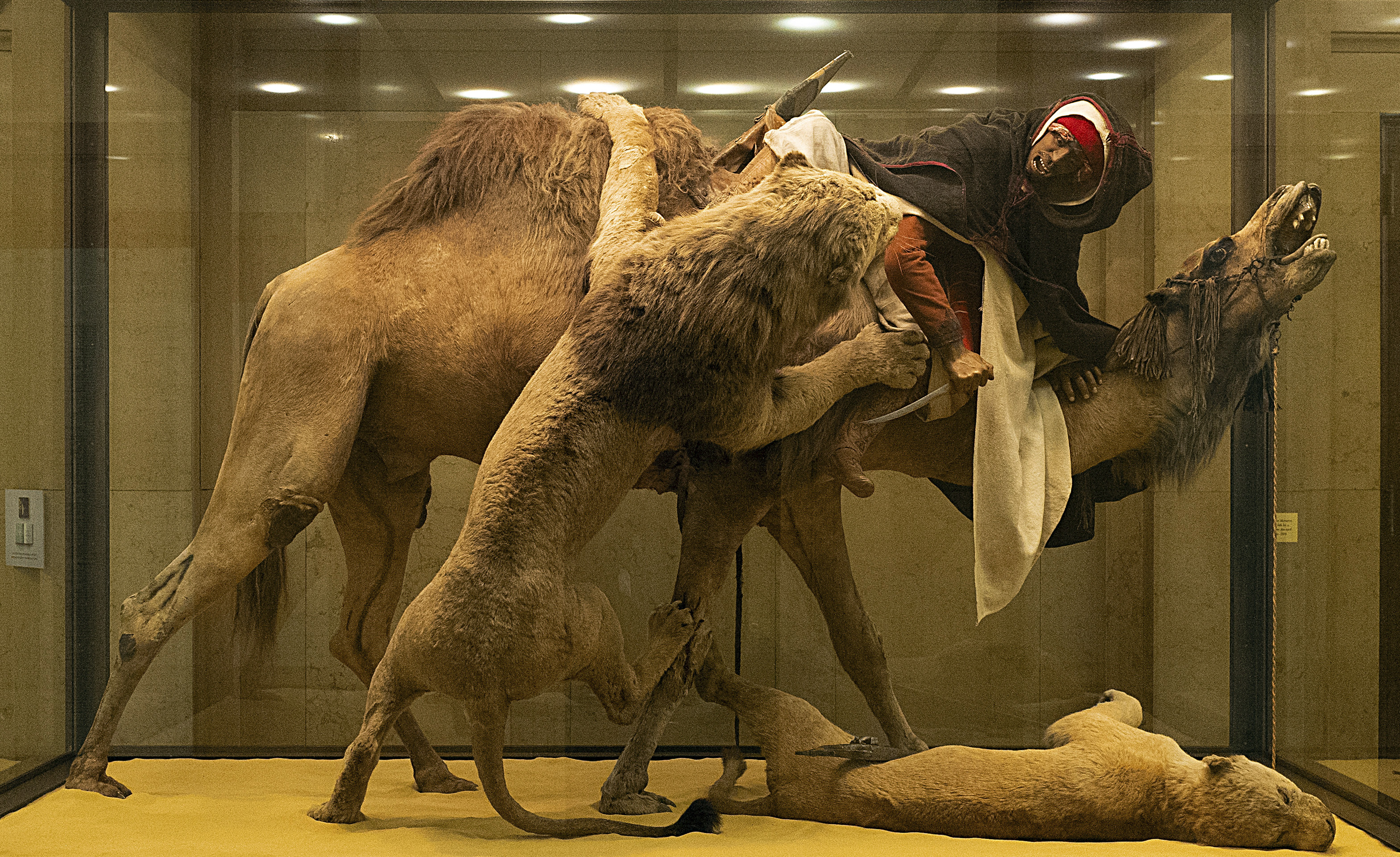
Lion Attacking a Dromedary is a taxidermy diorama by the Verreaux brothers. It was acquired by the Carnegie Museum in Pittsburgh in 1898, and the mannequin called the "Arab courier" was later found to include human remains, a skull with teeth. The stuffed animals are a dromedary, and male and female lions.

Verreaux worked for the family business, Maison Verreaux, established in 1803 by his father, Jacques Philippe Verreaux, at Place des Vosges in Paris, which was the earliest known company that dealt in objects of natural history. The company funded collection expeditions to various parts of the world. Maison Verreaux sold many specimens to the Muséum National d'Histoire Naturelle to add to its collections.

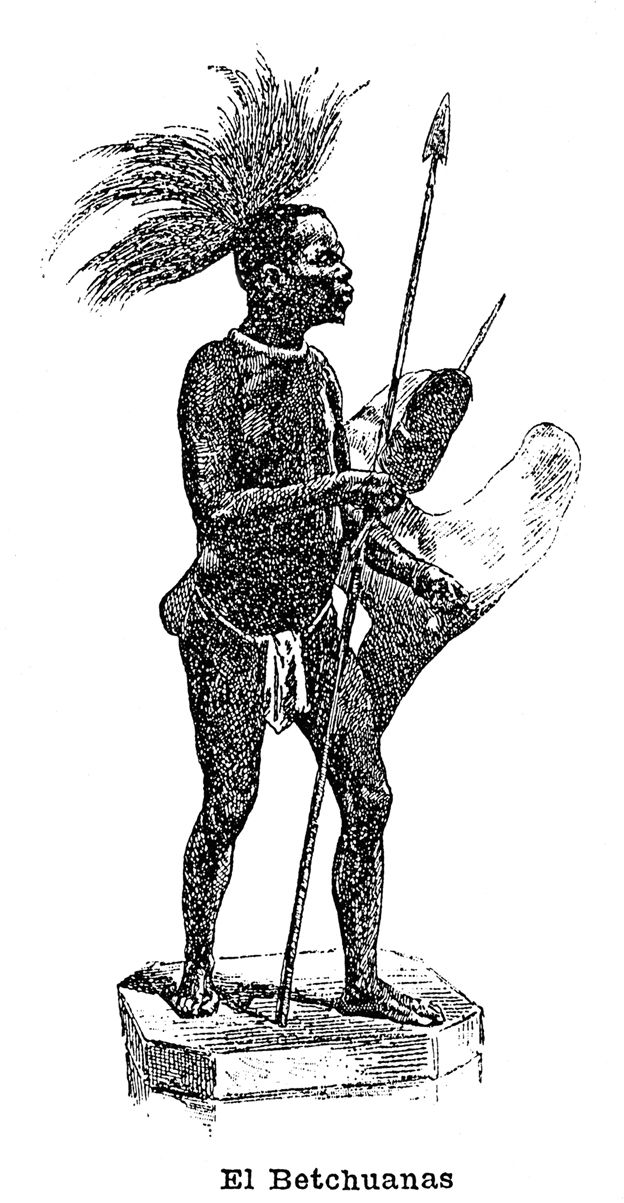
The body as exhibited in the 1888 Barcelona Universal Exposition.

In 1830, while travelling in modern-day Botswana or Litakou (in modern South Africa), Verreaux witnessed the burial of a Tswana warrior. Verreaux returned to the burial site under cover of night to dig up the African's body where he retrieved the skin, the skull and a few bones. Verreaux intended to ship the body back to France and so prepared and preserved the African warrior's corpse by using metal wire as a spine, wooden boards as shoulder blades and newspaper as a stuffing material. Then he shipped the body to Paris along with a batch of stuffed animals in crates. In 1831, the African's body appeared in a showroom at No. 3, Rue Saint Fiacre. He was later known as Negro of Banyoles, after being acquired by Francesc Darder, who exhibited it at the 1888 Barcelona Universal Exposition, and later moved it to the Darder Museum in Banyoles, Catalonia. It was only in the 1990s, following a campaign initiated by Dr Alphonse Arcelin, the mummified corpse was returned and buried in Botswana.

Verreaux travelled to Australia in 1842 to collect plants. He returned to France in 1851 with a natural history collection reported to contain 15,000 items.

In 1864 he took over from Florent Prévost as assistant naturalist at the Paris Museum. At the Exposition Universelle held in Paris in 1867, Verreaux exhibited the taxidermy group, "Lion Attacking a Dromedary".

Verreaux also worked in China and South Africa, where he helped Andrew Smith found the South African Museum in Cape Town in 1825.

== Legacy ==
He is commemorated in the names of:

- Verreaux's eagle (Aquila verreauxii),
- Verreaux's eagle-owl (Bubo lacteus),
- Verreaux's coua (Coua verreauxi),
- Verreaux's sifaka (Propithecus verreauxi),
- the white-tipped dove (Leptotila verreauxi),
- the golden parrotbill (Paradoxornis verreauxi),
- Verreaux's skink (Anomalopus verreauxii), and the
- Andaman giant gecko (Gekko verreauxi).
- The Southern Conger Eel Conger verreauxi Kaup, 1856 is also named after him.
