= Édouard Verreaux =

French naturalist and taxidermist

Jean Baptiste Édouard Verreaux (16 September 1810 – 14 March 1868) was a French naturalist, taxidermist, collector, and dealer. Botanist and ornithologist Jules Verreaux was his older brother.

== Career ==
In 1830, Verreaux travelled to South Africa to help his brother pack up a large consignment of specimens. He returned in 1832 before continuing to Sumatra, Java, the Philippines and Indo-China. In 1834, he took control of the family's natural history business in Paris.

=== Lion Attacking a Dromedary ===
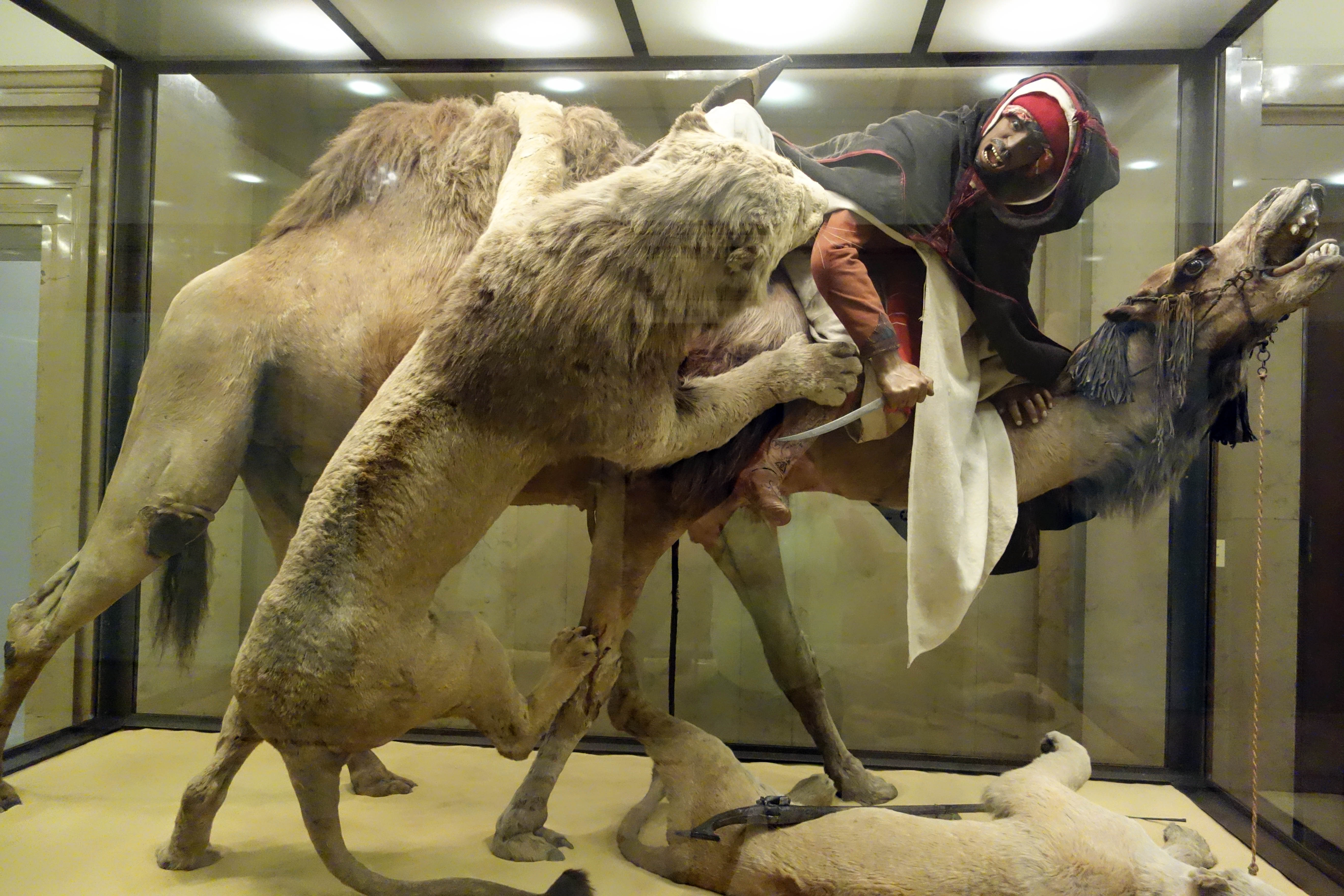
Lion Attacking a Dromedary in 2018

Verreaux designed and constructed the orientalist taxidermy diorama Lion Attacking a Dromedary for the Paris Exposition of 1867, where it won a gold medal. After the exposition, it was sold to the American Museum of Natural History, who exhibited it at the 1876 Centennial Exposition. The diorama was sold to the Carnegie Museum of Natural History in 1898, where it was displayed until its removal in 2020. The museum cited the work's lack of cultural accuracy and concerns raised by the Black Lives Matter movement as the reasons for the removal. In 2021, the diorama was put back on display at the Pittsburgh museum.

== Associated writings ==
- L'Océanie en Estampes, ou description géographie et historique de toutes les Îles du grand océan et du continent de la Nouvelle Hollande ... (with Jules Verreaux), 1832 – Prints of Oceania, or geographical and historical description of all the islands of the Pacific Ocean and the continent of New Holland.
- Catalogue des objets d'histoire naturelle : composant le cabinet de Mm. Veraux, pére et fils, naturalistes préparateurs, boulevard Montmartre, No. 6, 1833 – Cataloged objects of natural history, component of the firm Veraux, father and son, preparer-naturalists, Boulevard Montmartre, No. 6.
- Catalogue d'oiseaux, 1849 – Catalog of birds.
- Catalogue des Oiseaux disponibles dans la maison d'E. Verreaux, 1868 – Catalog of birds found in the house of E. Verreaux.
