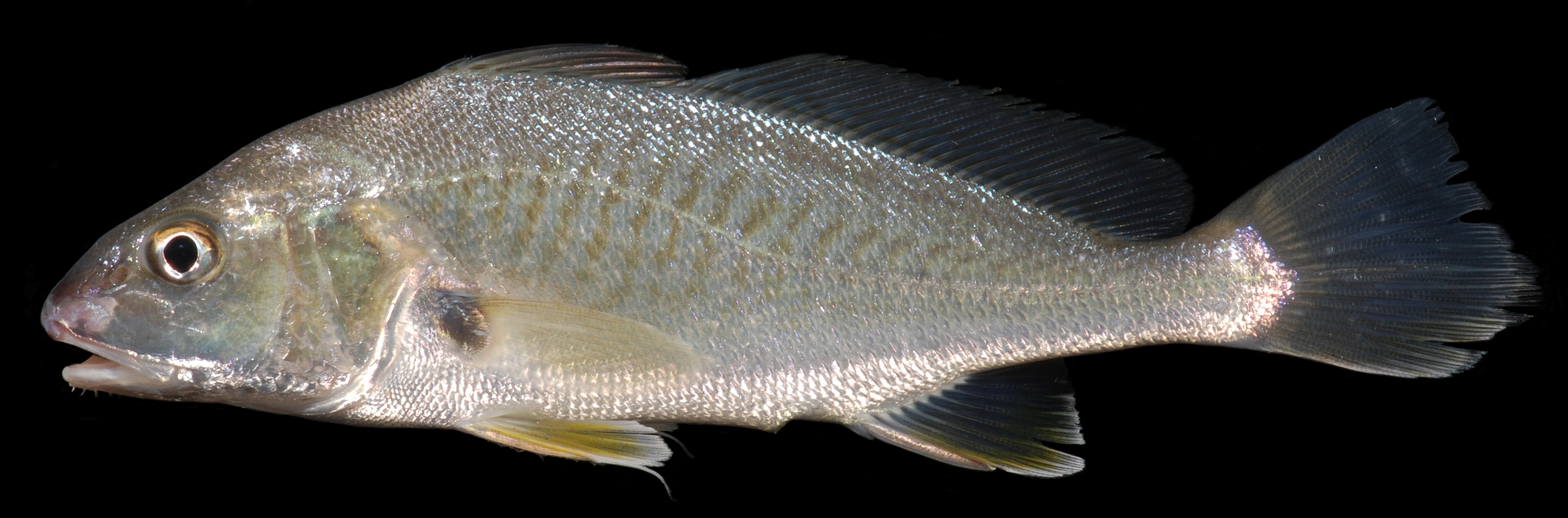

Conservation status
- Least Concern (IUCN 3.1)

Scientific classification
- Kingdom: Animalia
- Phylum: Chordata
- Class: Actinopterygii
- Division: Teleostei
- Order: Acanthuriformes
- Family: Sciaenidae
- Genus: Micropogonias
- Species: M. undulatus

Binomial name
- Micropogonias undulatus (Linnaeus, 1766)

Synonyms
- Perca undulata Linnaeus, 1766; Micropogon undulatus (Linnaeus, 1766); Sciaena croker Lacépède, 1802; Bodianus costatus Mitchill, 1815; Micropogon lineatus Cuvier, 1830

= Atlantic croaker =

Species of fish

The Atlantic croaker (Micropogonias undulatus) is a species of marine ray-finned fish belonging to the family Sciaenidae and is closely related to the black drum (Pogonias cromis), the silver perch (Bairdiella chrysoura), the spot croaker (Leiostomus xanthurus), the red drum (Sciaenops ocellatus), the spotted seatrout (Cynoscion nebulosus), and the weakfish (Cynoscion regalis). It is commonly found in sounds and estuaries from Massachusetts to the Gulf of Mexico.

== Description ==
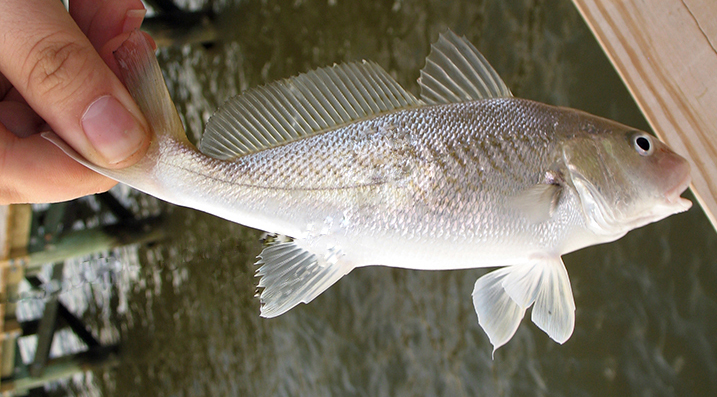
Atlantic croaker in Pass Christian, Mississippi

The name croaker is descriptive of the noise the fish makes by vibrating strong muscles against its swim bladder, which acts as a resonating chamber. The Atlantic croaker is the loudest of the drum family. It is also referred to as a hardhead, with smaller ones called pin heads. During spawning season (August to October), croakers turn a deep golden color, from this comes the name golden croaker. Beginning in August, tiny young enter the Chesapeake Bay and travel to low-salinity and freshwater creeks. They move to deeper parts of tidal rivers for the winter. Juveniles leave the bay with the adults the following autumn. When full-grown at 2 to 3 years old, croakers reach between 18 and 20 inches in length long and 4 to 5 pounds, but on average are 1/2-2 pounds. The fish's lifespan can reach up to 8 years. The Chesapeake Bay record Atlantic croaker, caught in August 2007 off New Point Comfort Lighthouse in Virginia, weighed 8 pounds, 11 ounces and measured 27 inches long. They have traditionally been used for food by Native Americans, and their remains are found in shell middens. These fish are popular catches among recreational anglers.

== Distribution and habitat ==
The Atlantic croaker is native to coastal waters in the western Atlantic Ocean. Its range extends from Massachusetts to Mexico and includes the northern half of the Caribbean Sea but possibly not the southern Gulf of Mexico or the Antilles. It is also thought to live on the coasts of southern Brazil and Argentina. It is usually found in bays and estuaries over sandy or muddy bottoms where it feeds on polychaete worms, crustaceans and small fish. The croaker visits the Chesapeake Bay from March through October and is found throughout the Bay as far north as the Susquehanna Flats.

== Management ==
Croaker populations greatly vary from year to year, and can be dependent on the conditions of their habitats. Their management is challenging due to the variability in their numbers. Due to a wide range and large population, croaker are listed as species of Least Concern by the IUCN.

== Importance in scientific research ==
In 1999, an androgen receptor protein called ZIP9 Protein was discovered in the brain, ovary and testicular tissues of Atlantic croaker.
