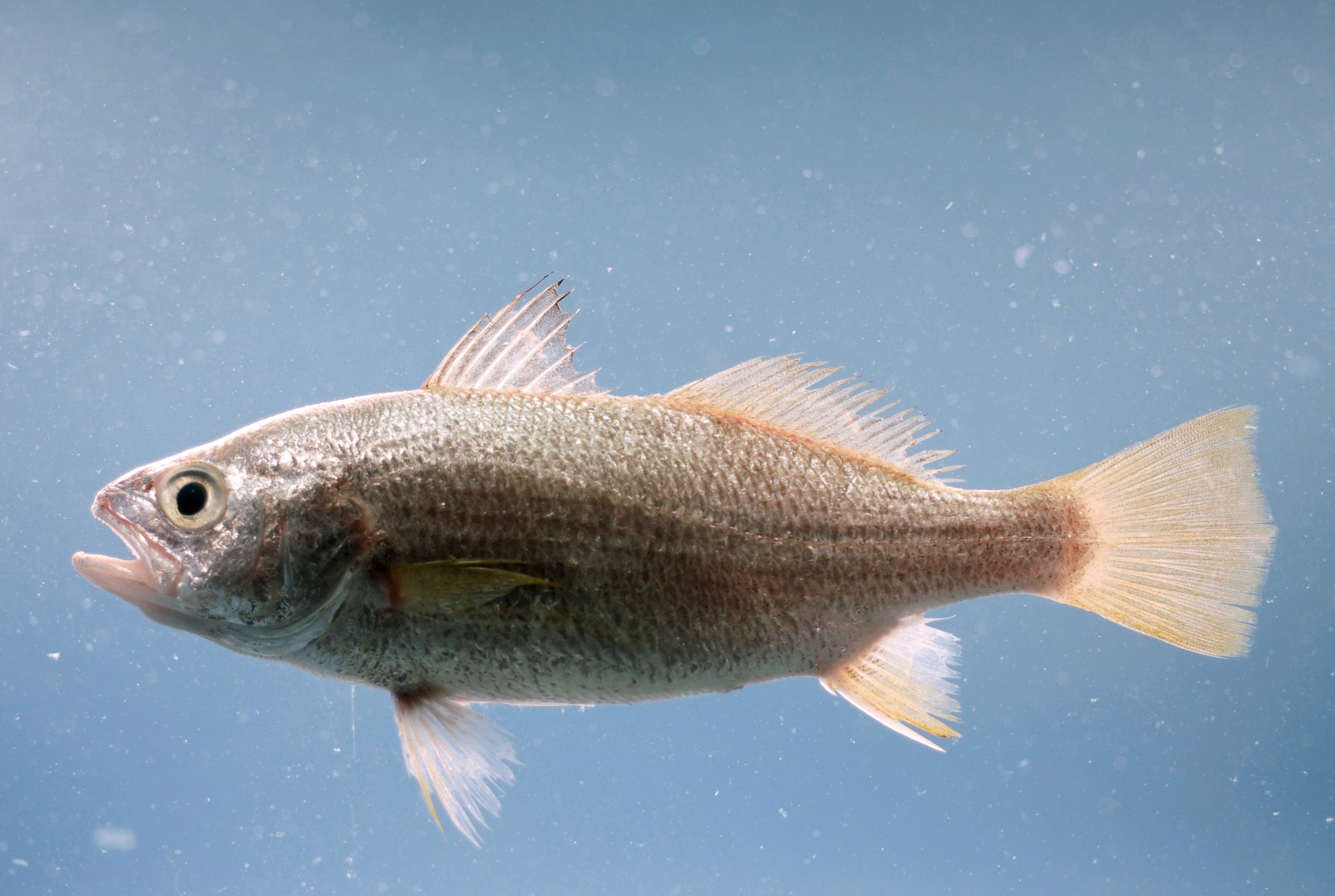

Conservation status
- Least Concern (IUCN 3.1)

Scientific classification
- Kingdom: Animalia
- Phylum: Chordata
- Class: Actinopterygii
- Division: Teleostei
- Order: Acanthuriformes
- Family: Sciaenidae
- Genus: Bairdiella
- Species: B. chrysoura

Binomial name
- Bairdiella chrysoura (Lacépède, 1802)

Synonyms
- Dipterodon chrysourus Lacépède, 1802; Perca punctatus Linnaeus, 1766; Bodianus argyroleucus Mitchill, 1815; Bodianus exiguus Mitchill, 1815; Bodianus pallidus Mitchill, 1815

= Bairdiella chrysoura =

Species of fish

Bairdiella chrysoura, the American silver perch, silver croaker or goldtail croaker, is a species of marine ray-finned fish belonging to the family Sciaenidae, the drums and croakers. This species is widespread along the eastern cost of North America and is commonly caught by inshore anglers in search of larger species. This fish is common up to 20 cm (7.9 in), but can be found uncommonly to 30 cm (12 in).

== Description ==
Bairdiella chrysoura has a moderately large, obliquely rising terminal mouth. The lower jaw projects further than the upper jaw. The chin does not bear a barbel but has three pairs of mental pores (the arrangement of the barbels and under-chin pores provides a means to distinguish between different members of the family Sciaenidae). The preopercle, the bony plate just in front of the operculum, bears a few spines set at an angle. The dorsal fin has ten to eleven spines and nineteen to twenty-three soft rays. The anal fin has two spines, the second of which is sharp and more than two thirds the length of the first soft ray, and eight to ten soft rays. This fish has a two-chambered swim bladder which is connected to the inner ear. It has good hearing, on a par with the goldfish which is renowned for its auditory ability. Its general color is silvery, greenish, or bluish on the dorsal surface and silvery or yellowish on the underside. The fins are yellowish or greyish.

Silver perch are similar in appearance to the sand seatrout or silver seatrout, two closely related species of weakfish. Seatrout usually have 1 or 2 prominent canine teeth at the tip of upper jaw and do not have chin pores.

== Distribution and habitat ==
Bairdiella chrysoura are native to the east coast of the North America. Its range extends from New York to Mexico. They are found inshore in seagrass beds, tidal creeks and rivers, and marshes.

== Behavior ==
Bairdiella chrysoura spawns in shallow, saline portions of bays and other inshore areas, peaking between May and September. Silver perch mature by second or third year (by 6 inches). Adults eat crustaceans and small fishes. They may live to 6 years.

== Sources ==
- Smithsonian Marine Station
- Florida Fish and Wildlife Conservation Commission
