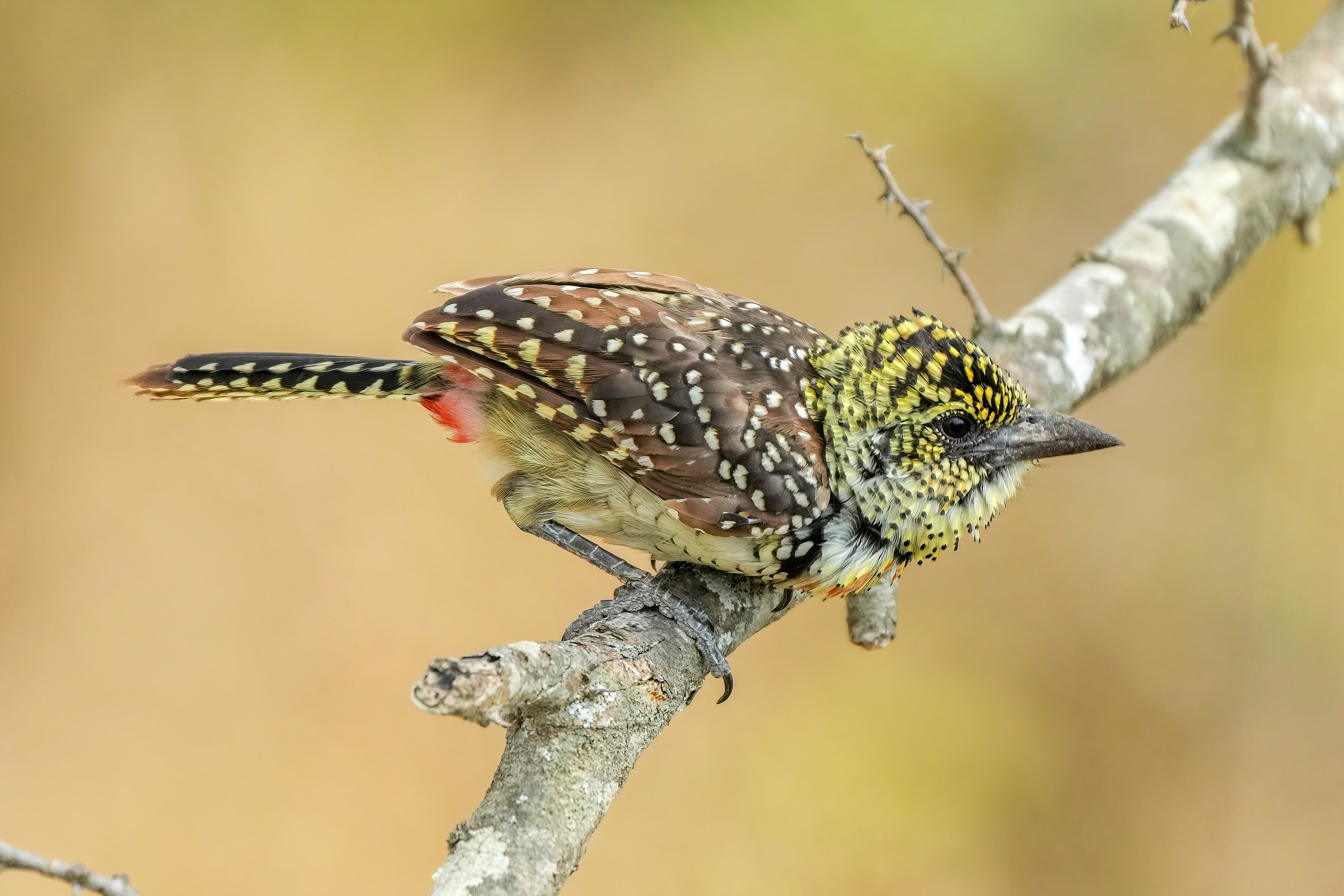
- T. usambiro in Tanzania

Conservation status
- Least Concern (IUCN 3.1)

Scientific classification
- Kingdom: Animalia
- Phylum: Chordata
- Class: Aves
- Order: Piciformes
- Family: Lybiidae
- Genus: Trachyphonus
- Species: T. usambiro

Binomial name
- Trachyphonus usambiro Neumann, 1908

Synonyms
- Trachyphonus darnaudii usambiro

= Usambiro barbet =

Subspecies of bird

The Usambiro barbet (Trachyphonus usambiro) is a species of bird in the African barbet family Lybiidae. It was formerly considered a subspecies of D'Arnaud's barbet, along with Emin's barbet, but was split as a distinct species by the IOC in 2021. It varies from the nominate in having longer wings, a shorter tail, and darker bill. The Usambiro barbet was originally described as a subspecies of D'Arnaud's barbet in 1908 by Oscar Rudolph Neumann from a specimen collected in Usambiro in Tanzania. It is now treated as a valid species in its own right.

It is found in southern Kenya and northern Tanzania, and in Maasai Mara National Reserve and Serengeti National Park as free-ranging wildlife. The species inhabits open areas including savannah, grassland, shrubland and pastures. It ranges from 1,100 to 2,100 m (3,600 to 6,900 ft) above sea-level. Where the species' range overlaps with the Red-and-yellow barbet, this species will avoid the streambeds favoured by the larger red-and-yellow barbet and occupies flat areas.

The Usambiro barbet is 18–19 cm (7.1–7.5 in) long and weighs 37–50.5 g (1.31–1.78 oz). The head is yellow with black spots and the wings are black with white spots. The breast is also yellow with a dark breast band. The belly is pale yellow with a reddish vent. The sexes are similar.

The diet of this species is assumed to be the same as the D'Arnaud's barbet, comprising seeds, fruit and a wide range of insects.
