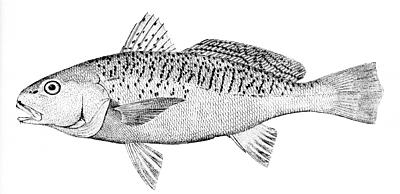
- Micropogonias undulatus

Scientific classification
- Kingdom: Animalia
- Phylum: Chordata
- Class: Actinopterygii
- Order: Acanthuriformes
- Family: Sciaenidae
- Genus: Micropogonias; Bonaparte, 1831

Type species
- Micropogon lineatus Cuvier, 1830

Species
- see text

Synonyms
- Micropogon Cuvier, 1830

= Micropogonias =

Finebarbel Croakers

Genus of fishes

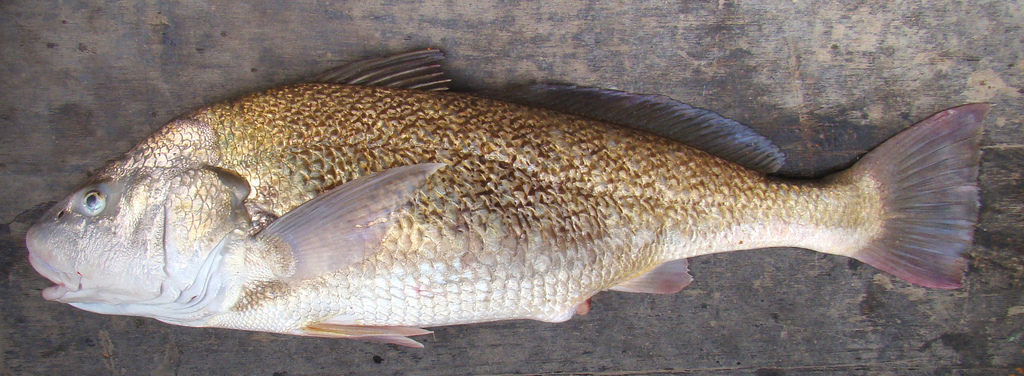
Micropogonias furnieri

Micropogonias is a genus of marine ray-finned fishes belonging to the family Sciaenidae, the drums and croakers. These fishes are found in the eastern Pacific and western Atlantic Oceans.

== Taxonomy ==
Micropogonias was first proposed as a genus in 1831 by the French naturalist and ornithologist Charles Lucien Bonaparte, with Micropogon lineatus being its type species by virtue of being a replacement name. Micropgon lineatus had been described by Georges Cuvier in 1830 with its type locality given as Havana. However, Cuviers' name was objectively invalid as it had already been used for Micropogon Boie, 1826 in birds. It was subsequently determined that Cuviers' M. lineatus was a synonym of Desmarest's Umbrina furnieri and so M. funieri is the type species of the genus Micropogonias. This genus has been placed in the subfamily Micropogoniinae by some workers, but the 5th edition of Fishes of the World does not recognise subfamilies within the Sciaenidae, which it places in the order Acanthuriformes.

== Etymology ==
Micropogonias combines micro, which means "small", with pogonias meaning "bearded", an allusion to the small barbels on the chin of the type species.

== Species ==
Micropogonias has the following species classified within it:

- Micropogonias altipinnis Günther, 1865 (Tailfin croaker)
- Micropogonias ectenes. (Jordan & Gilbert, 1883) (Slender croaker)
- Micropogonias fasciatus (de Buen, 1961)
- Micropogonias furnieri (Desmarest, 1823) (Whitemouth croaker)
- Micropogonias megalops (Gilbert, 1890)
- Micropogonias undulatus (Linnaeus, 1766) (Atlantic croaker)

However, Catalog of Fishes recognises the following species as valid within Micropogonias:

- Micropogonias altipinnis (Günther, 1864)
- Micropogonias cevegei (Cervigón 1982)
- Micropogonias furnieri (Desmarest 1823)
- Micropogonias megalops (Gilbert 1890)
- Micropogonias undulatus (Linnaeus 1766)

Catalog of Fishes treats M. ectenes as a synonym of M. altipinnis and M. fasciatus as a synonym of Paralonchurus peruanus.

== Characteristics ==
Micropogonias croakers have an elongated body, with a high dorsal profile and an almost flat ventral surface and a conical head. The preoperculum has between 10 and 14 spines on its margin with between 2 and 5 robust spines at its angle. The mouth is under the snout and has villiform teeth arranged in bands, with the outer row in the upper jaw being made up of slightly larger teeth than the rest. The anterior, spiny part of the dorsal fin is quite tall, with the third spine being longer than the others, while the soft rayed part of the dorsal fin is supported by between 26 and 30 soft rays. The anal fin has two spines, the second spine being robust and half the length of first anal fin ray, and between 7 and 9 soft rays. The caudal fin has sharp point. The largest species is the tailfin croaker (M. altipinnis) which has a maximum published total length of 90 cm (35 in) while the smallest, M. megalops, has a maximum published total length of 40 cm (16 in).

== Distribution and habitat ==
Micropogonias croakers are found in the eastern Pacific Ocean and the Western Atlantic Ocean, with two species (M. furnieri and M. undulatus) in the Atlantic (M. cevegei sensu Catalog of Fishes is also found in the Atlantic) and the remaining four in the eastern Pacific. These fishes live in estuaries and in inshore waters with sand or mud substrates.
