= White trout =

White trout is a common name for several fish and may refer to:

- Cynoscion arenarius
- Salmo trutta
