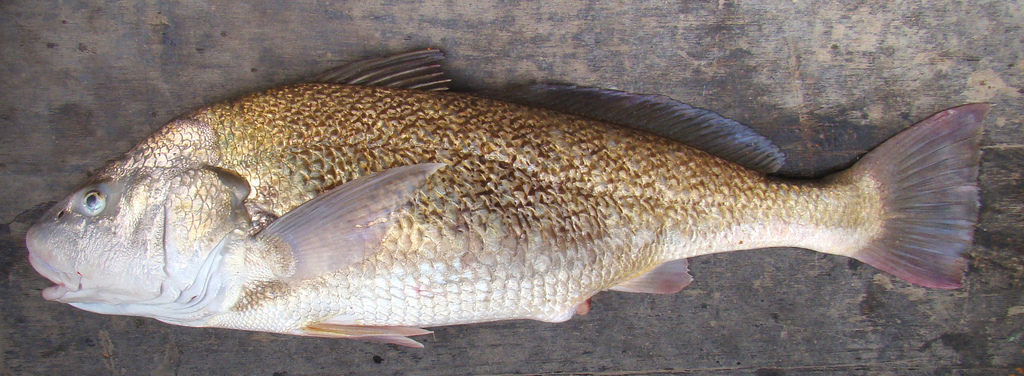

Conservation status
- Least Concern (IUCN 3.1)

Scientific classification
- Kingdom: Animalia
- Phylum: Chordata
- Class: Actinopterygii
- Order: Acanthuriformes
- Family: Sciaenidae
- Genus: Micropogonias
- Species: M. furnieri

Binomial name
- Micropogonias furnieri (Desmarest, 1823)

Synonyms
- Corvina adusta Agassiz, 1831; Micropogon argenteus Cuvier, 1830; Micropogon barretoi MacDonagh, 1934; Corvina crawfordi Regan, 1903; Umbrina furnieri Desmarest, 1823; Micropogon furnieri (Desmarest 1823); Micropogon lineatus Cuvier, 1830; Micropogon manni Moreno, 1970; Sciaena opercularis Quoy & Gaimard, 1825; Micropogon opercularis (Quoy & Gaimard, 1825); Micropogon patagonensis MacDonagh, 1934; Sciaena unicirrata Larrañaga, 1923; Ophioscion woodwardi Fowler, 1937

= Micropogonias furnieri =

Species of fish

Micropogonias furnieri, the whitemouth croaker, golden croaker, hardhead, mangrove snapper, rocando ronco, two-belly bashaw, West Indian croaker, West Indian drum or whitemouth drummer, is a species of marine ray-finned fish belonging to the family Sciaenidae, the drums and croakers. This fish is found in the western Atlantic Ocean.

== Taxonomy ==
Micropogonias furnieri was first formally described in 1823 as Umbrina furnieri by the French zoologist Anselme Gaëtan Desmarest with its type locality given as Havana. The genus Micropogonias was originally proposed as a genus in 1830by Georges Cuvier when he described Micropogon lineatus, also from Havana, but that genus name was objectively invalid preoccupied by Micropogon Boie, 1826 in birds. It was subsequently determined that Cuviers' M. lineatus was a synonym of Desmarest's Umbrina furnieri and so this species is the type species of the genus Micropogonias. This species has been placed in the subfamily Micropogoniinae by some workers, but the 5th edition of Fishes of the World does not recognise subfamilies within the Sciaenidae which it places in the order Acanthuriformes.

== Etymology ==
Micropogonias furnieri has a specific name which honours a Marcellin Fournier, the who collected specimens in Cuba and who gave Desmarest the type, Desmarest may have dropped the "o" in Fournier's name in error.

== Description ==
Micropogonia furnieri has a slightly compressed, elongate body with a snout that clearly protrudes beyond the moderately large and inferior mouth. The mouth has villiform teeth arranged in bands, with the outer row in the upper jaw being made up of slightly larger teeth than the rest. The chin has 5 pores and between 3 and 5 rather small barbels along the side of the lower jaw but not on the edge. There are 10 pores on the snout with 5 on the front and 5 along the side. The eye is relatively large. The preoperculum has robust serrations along its edge. The dorsal fin is incised with 10 spines in front of the incision and a single spine and between 26 and 30 soft rays after the incision, typically no more than 27. The anal fin is supported by 2 spines, the second spine being robust and half the length of first anal fin ray, and between 7 and 9 soft rays. The caudal fin has a concave edge on its upper and lower lobes separated by an angular point. This species has an overall silver colour on the body with a brown back with dark, vertical streaks running to just below the lateral line. The maximum published total length for the whitemouth croaker is 60 cm (24 in), although 45 cm (18 in) is more typical.

== Distribution and habitat ==
Micropogonia furnieri is found in the western Atlantic Ocean where it occurs in the Gulf of Mexico off Veracruz and northeastern Cuba, through the Caribbean from Cuba southwards and along the coast of Central and South America from southern Belize south to northern Argentina. It is found at depths down to 80 m (260 ft) over muddy and sandy substrates in coastal waters. Juveniles in their first year are found around the mouths of rivers and in estuaries, with the older fish living in deeper coastal areas. These fishes are euryhaline and is able to tolerate disturbanceof its habitat, to some extent.

== Biology ==
Micropogonia furnieri has a diet that varies with age, with newly hatched fish feeding largely on copepods, as they grow they change prey to migratory crustaceans as well as benthic and sessile molluscs. It will feed on a variety of prey when its preferred prey is unavailable., including fishes and polychaetes. They gather in small schools outside the breeding season but form large aggregations in the summer to breed which is when these fish do most of their croaking. This sound can attract predators such as the bottle-nosed dolphin (Tursiops truncatus). The eggs have an oil which makes the buoyant and they float near the surface. Sexual maturity is reached between 4 months and 2 years old.

== Fisheries ==
Global capture production of Whitemouth croaker (Micropogonias furnieri) in thousand tonnes from 1950 to 2022, as reported by the FAO

Micropogonia furnieri is a target species for fisheries in Colombia and Venezuela, as well as in southern Brazil, Uruguay and Argentina where it is the most important species for coastal fisheries. It is caught using gill nets and bottom trawls and in southern Brazil, Uruguay and Argentina over 64,000 tonnes were landed in 2018. Elsewhere it is a bycatch in shrimp trawl fisheries and is often used as bait. It is regarded as an important food fish and the catch is either sold fresh or preserved by salting.
