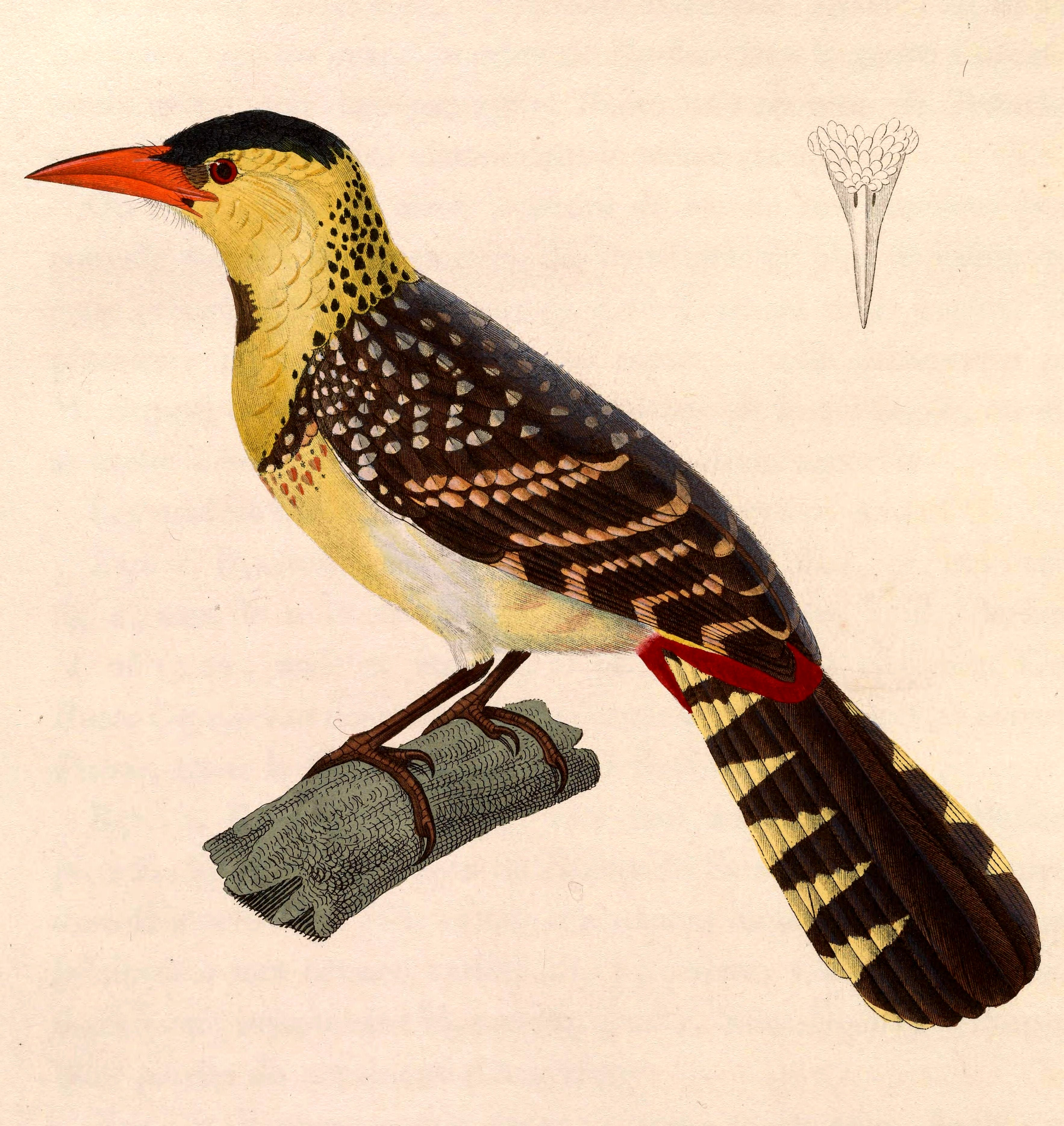

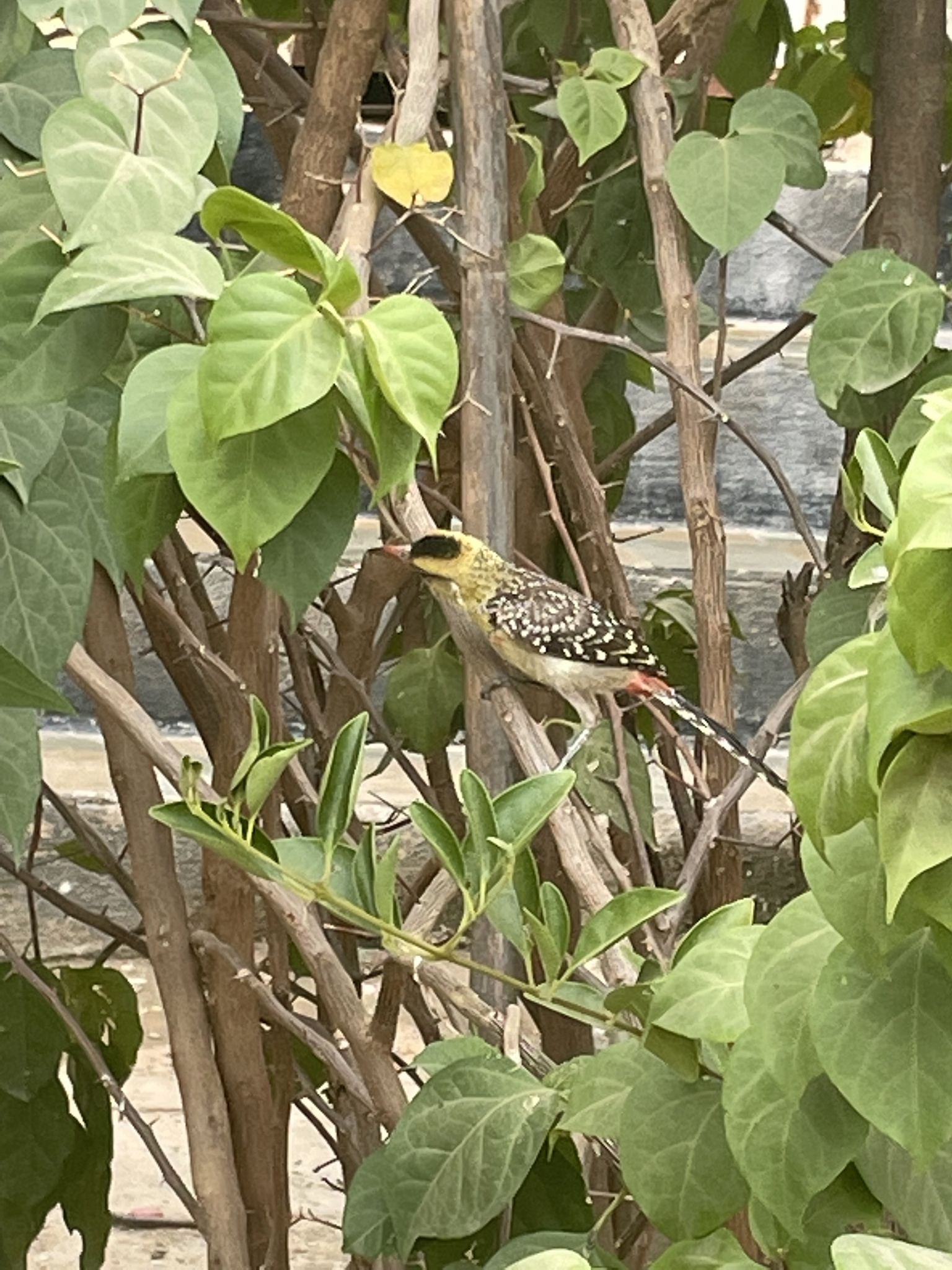

Conservation status
- Least Concern (IUCN 3.1)

Scientific classification
- Kingdom: Animalia
- Phylum: Chordata
- Class: Aves
- Order: Piciformes
- Family: Lybiidae
- Genus: Trachyphonus
- Species: T. margaritatus

Binomial name
- Trachyphonus margaritatus (Cretzschmar, 1828)

Subspecies
- T. m. margaritatus - (Cretzschmar, 1828); T. m. somalicus - Zedlitz, 1910

= Yellow-breasted barbet =

Species of bird

The yellow-breasted barbet (Trachyphonus margaritatus) is a species of bird in the Lybiidae family. It is found in Burkina Faso, Chad, Djibouti, Eritrea, Ethiopia, Mali, Mauritania, Niger, Nigeria, Somalia, and Sudan.
