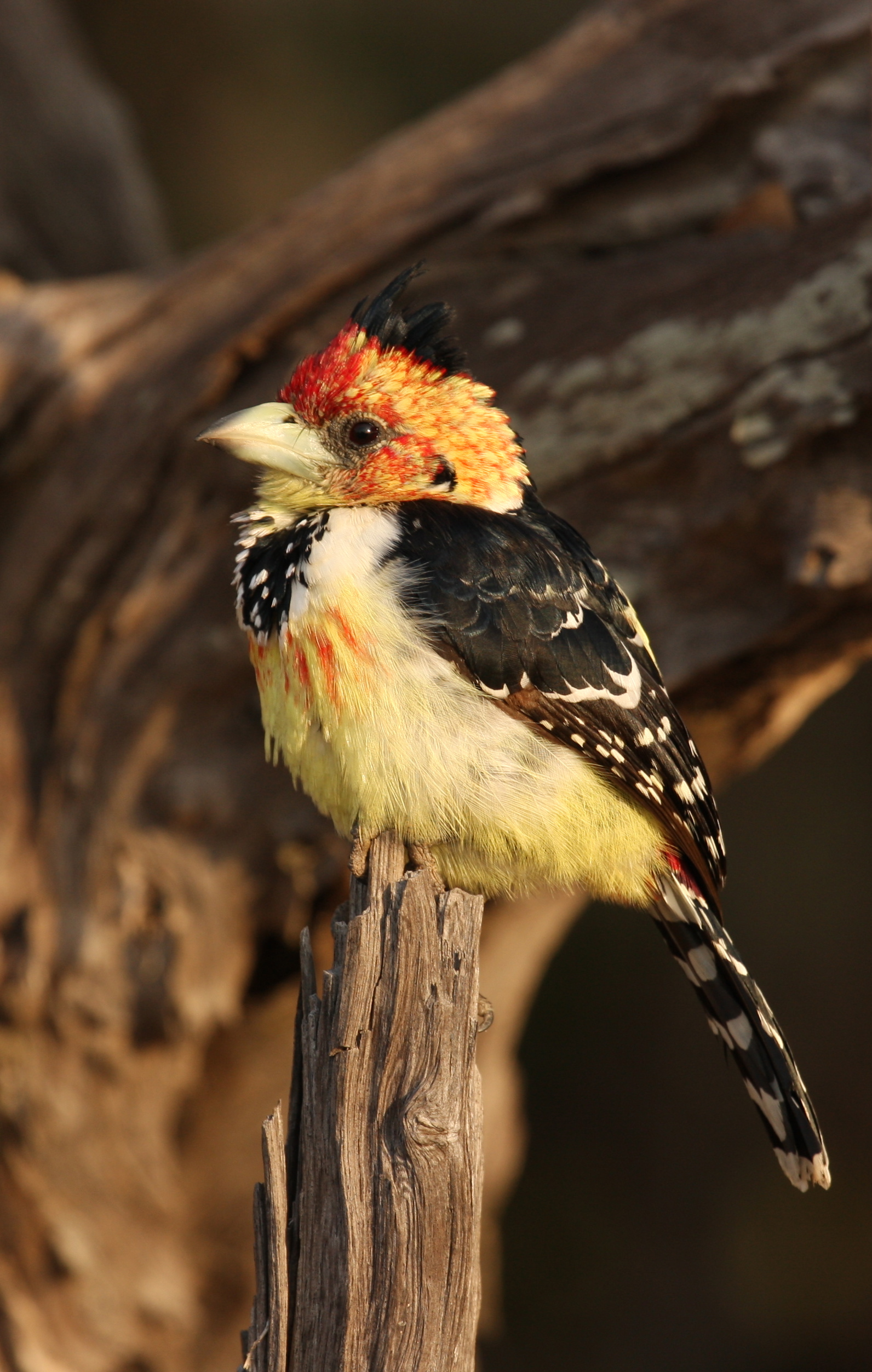
- In Selous Game Reserve, Tanzania

Conservation status
- Least Concern (IUCN 3.1)

Scientific classification
- Kingdom: Animalia
- Phylum: Chordata
- Class: Aves
- Order: Piciformes
- Family: Lybiidae
- Genus: Trachyphonus
- Species: T. vaillantii

Binomial name
- Trachyphonus vaillantii Ranzani, 1821

Subspecies
- T. v. suahelicus - Reichenow, 1887; T. v. vaillantii - Ranzani, 1821

= Crested barbet =

Species of bird

The crested barbet (Trachyphonus vaillantii) ('trachys'=rough, 'phone'=voice, sound') is a sub-Saharan bird in the Lybiidae family. Its specific name commemorates François Levaillant, a famed French naturalist.

== Subspecies ==
Two subspecies are recognized, with T. v. nobilis usually included in the nominate subspecies. The subspecies are distinguished by subtle differences in speckling, body size and color intensity. Individual variation is typical however, besides being paler in drier regions, and richer in colour in wetter areas.

- Trachyphonus vaillantii vaillantii — occurs commonly from Central to Southern Africa
- Trachyphonus vaillantii suahelicus — to the north and east of the nominate, Angola, DRC in Central Africa, to Tanzania and Mozambique in East Africa

== Description ==
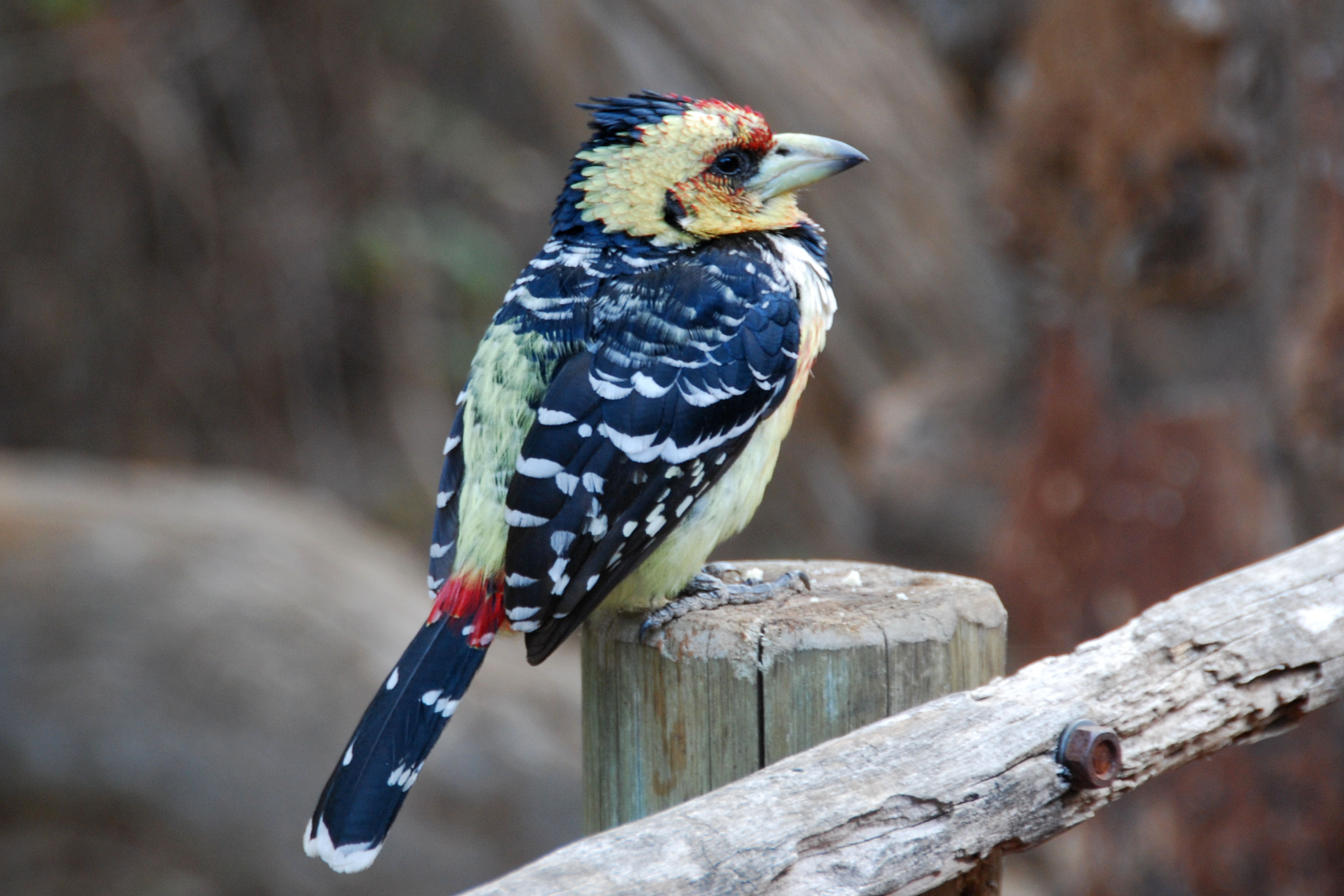
At Madikwe Game Reserve, South Africa

With its thick bill and very colourful plumage the crested barbet is unmistakable. This small bird has a speckled yellow and red face with a small black crest. The belly is yellow with red speckles, wings are black with white specks and it has a broad black band on its neck. Yellow head and body with black and white feathers, red markings on end of body, its colour blends well in the bush. They have a distinct trill.

== Diet ==
The crested barbet feeds on insects, other birds' eggs and fruits and sometimes mice.

== Breeding ==
They nest in a hole in a tree or a log in a suburban garden. They are monogamous and territorial during breeding. Territory size varies according to their habitat. One to five eggs are laid at daily intervals between September and December. Incubation lasts between 13 and 17 days, beginning with the second or third egg and mainly by the female. The young hatch naked and blind. They are fed insects by both parents. Faecal material is removed regularly. They fledge after about 31 days. Up to five broods have been recorded in a breeding season.

== Behaviour ==
They are found singly or in pairs. They like to bounce around on the ground looking for food, they usually call from a branch out in the open. They do not fly easily and then only for short distances. Crested barbets roost in holes in trees. They are very vocal, the call being a trill that can continue for long periods. Crested barbets are aggressive towards other birds in their territory and chase off both nest competitors such as other barbets and other birds such as doves and thrushes. They have also been recorded to have attacked rats and killed snakes.

Call of the male crested barbet

== Habitat ==
It is found in forests, savannah, suburban gardens, woodland thickets and watercourses in Angola, Botswana, Burundi, Democratic Republic of the Congo, Eswatini, Malawi, Mozambique, Namibia, Rwanda, South Africa, Tanzania, Uganda, Zambia, and Zimbabwe.
