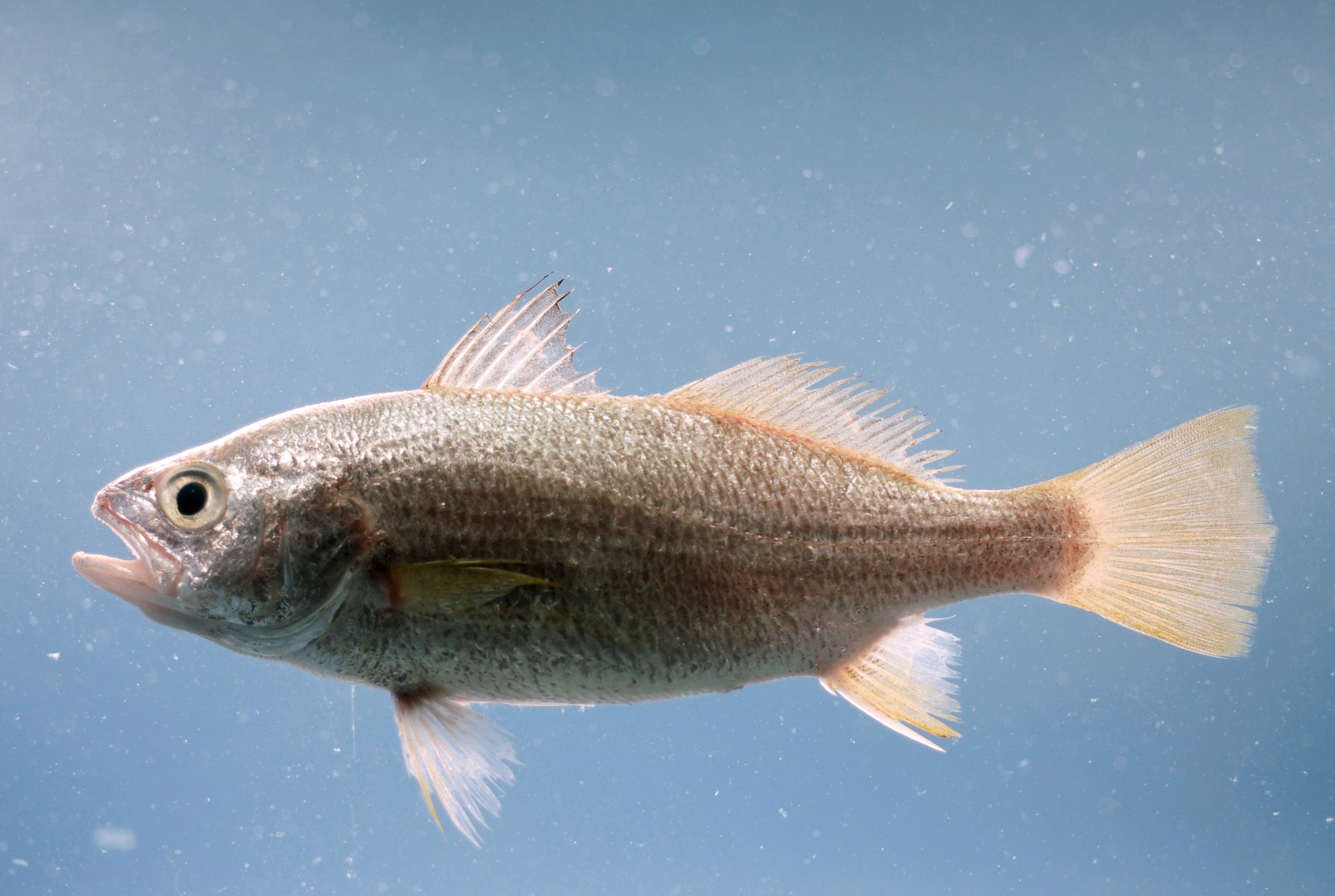
- Bairdiella chrysoura

Scientific classification
- Kingdom: Animalia
- Phylum: Chordata
- Class: Actinopterygii
- Order: Acanthuriformes
- Family: Sciaenidae
- Genus: Bairdiella; Gill, 1861

Type species
- Bodianus argyroleucus Mitchill, 1815

Synonyms
- Nector Jordan & Evermann, 1898; Vacuoqua Jordan & Evermann, 1927

= Bairdiella =

Genus of fishes

Bairdiella is a genus of marine ray-finned fishes belonging to the family Sciaenidae, the drums and croakers. These fishes are found in the western Atlantic and eastern Pacific Ocean.

== Taxonomy ==
Bairdiella was first proposed as a monospecific genus in 1815 by the American biologist Theodore Gill with Bodianus argyroleucus, a species described in 1815 by Samuel L. Mitchill from New York, as its only species. Mitchill's B. argryleucus was later shown to be a synonym of Dipterodon chrysourus which had been described by Bernard Germain de Lacépède in 1802 from "Carolina". Bairdiella belongs to the family Sciaenidae in the order Acanthuriformes. Some authorities place Bairdiella in the subfamily Stelliferinae but subfamilies are not recognised within Sciaenidae by Fishes of the World.

== Etymology ==
Bairdiella suffixes the surname Baird with the diminutive -iella, Gill did not explain whom he was honoring with the name but it is most likely to be Spencer Fullerton Baird, the director of the United States National Museum where Gill worked.

== Species ==
There are currently seven recognized species in this genus:

- Bairdiella armata Gill, 1863 – armed croaker
- Bairdiella chrysoura (Lacépède, 1802) – silver perch
- Bairdiella ensifera (Jordan & Gilbert, 1882) – swordspine croaker
- Bairdiella goeldi Marceniuk, Molina, Caires, Rotundo, Wosiacki & Oliveira, 2019
- Bairdiella icistia (Jordan & Gilbert, 1882) – ronco croaker
- Bairdiella ronchus (Cuvier, 1830) – ground croaker
- Bairdiella veraecrucis Jordan & Dickerson, 1908

== Characteristics ==
Bairdiella is a genus of relatively small Sciaenids. They have an elongate, compressed body with a slender head and a short, blunt snout. There are no barbels on the chin but there are mental pores. The large mouth is slightly oblique and extends back as far as the posterior edge of the orbit. The teeth are conical and arranged in thin rows. The upper angle of the gill slit is notched and the preoperculum is serrated with large spines at its angle. There is a deep incision in the dorsal fin between the spines and the soft rays. There are 2 spins and between 8 and 10 soft rays in the anal fin. The caudal fin is rounded and blunt or angular and blunt with the lateral line reaching the center of the caudal fin. Almost all of the scales are ctenoid. These croakers have maximum published total lengths of 30 to 35 cm (12 to 14 in).

== Distribution and habitat ==
Bairdiella croakers are coastal fishes from the eastern Pacific Ocean and western Atlantic Ocean.
