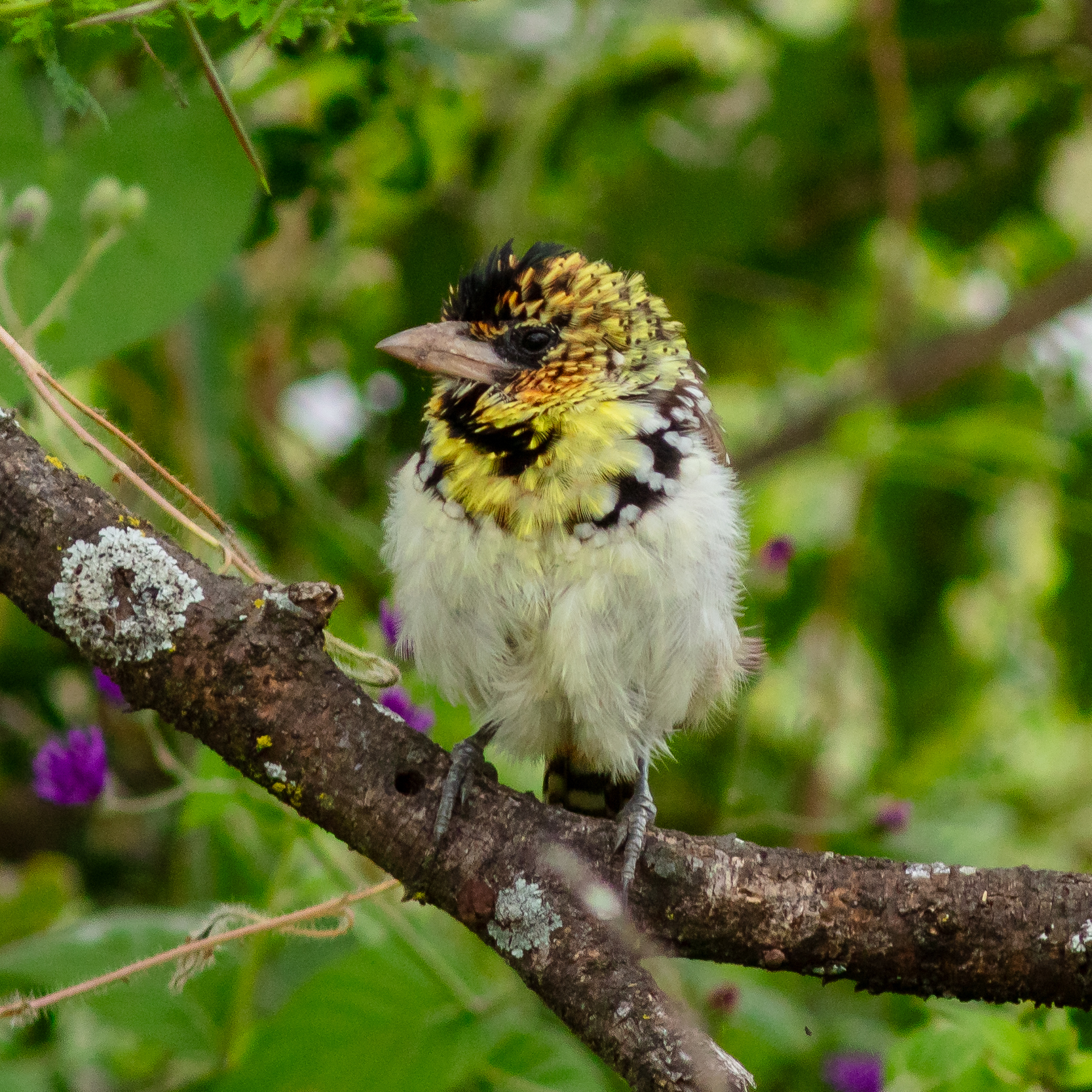

Conservation status
- Least Concern (IUCN 3.1)

Scientific classification
- Kingdom: Animalia
- Phylum: Chordata
- Class: Aves
- Order: Piciformes
- Family: Lybiidae
- Genus: Trachyphonus
- Species: T. darnaudii

Binomial name
- Trachyphonus darnaudii (Prévost & Des Murs, 1847)
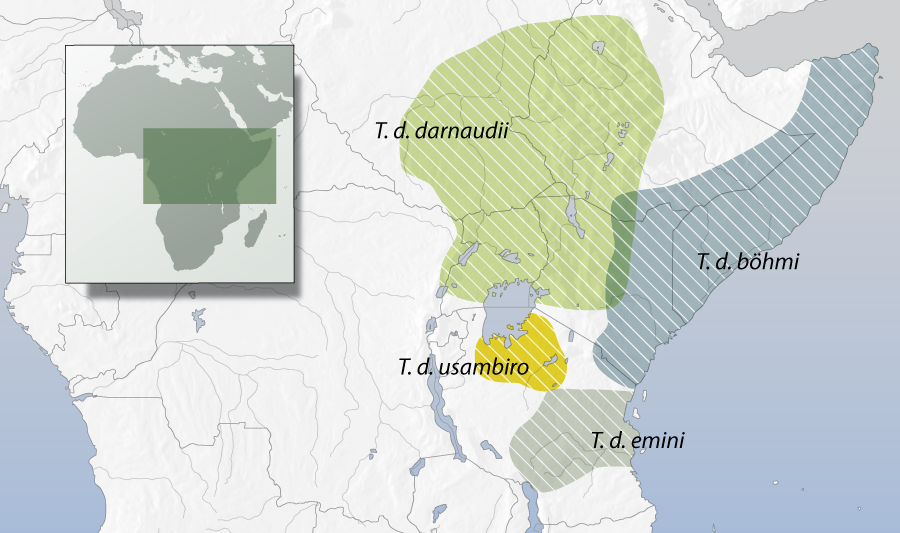

= D'Arnaud's barbet =

Species of bird

D'Arnaud's barbet (Trachyphonus darnaudii) is a species of bird in the family Lybiidae that is found in East Africa. Barbets and toucans are a group of birds with a worldwide tropical distribution. The barbets get their name from the bristles which fringe their heavy bills. Three geographical races (darnaudii, böhmi, emini) have been recorded. The usambiro barbet was previously regarded as a subspecies, but the 2021 taxonomic update to the IOC World Bird List upgraded this to full species status with the taxonomic name Trachyphonus usambiro.

== Taxonomy ==
D'Arnaud's barbet was formally described in 1847 as Micropogon darnaudii by the French naturalists Florent Prévost and Marc Athanase Parfait Œillet des Murs. The species was named in honour of the French explorer and engineer Joseph Pons d'Arnaud. The type locality is the Kordofan region of central Sudan. D'Arnaud's barbet is now one of four species placed in the genus Trachyphonus that was introduced 1821 by the Italian naturalist Camillo Ranzani.

Four subspecies are recognised:

- T. d. darnaudii (Prévost, F & des Murs, MAPO, 1847) – southeastern South Sudan, southwestern Ethiopia, northeastern Uganda, and west-central Kenya
- T. d. boehmi Fischer, GA & Reichenow, A, 1884 – southern and eastern Ethiopia to southern Somalia, eastern Kenya, and northeastern Tanzania
- T. d. emini Reichenow, A, 1891 – north-central Tanzania (east to Dar es Salaam suburbs)

The Usambiro barbet, T. usambiro, found in southwestern Kenya to north-central Tanzania, has sometimes been considered as a subspecies, T. d. usambiro (Neumann, OR, 1908). Since 2021 it has been regarded as a separate species, the Usambiro barbet.

== Behaviour ==
D'Arnaud's barbet is a small East African bird that feeds on insects, fruits, and seeds. It grows to about eight inches, and is equally at home in trees or on the ground. A vertical tunnel two to three feet into the ground with a sideways and upward turn leads to the nest chamber. In a striking dance the male and female face each on nearby twigs and twitch, bob and sing like mechanical toys.

They vocalize in groups, starting with a specific vocalization described as a chewp noise, often simultaneously raising and fanning the tail.
