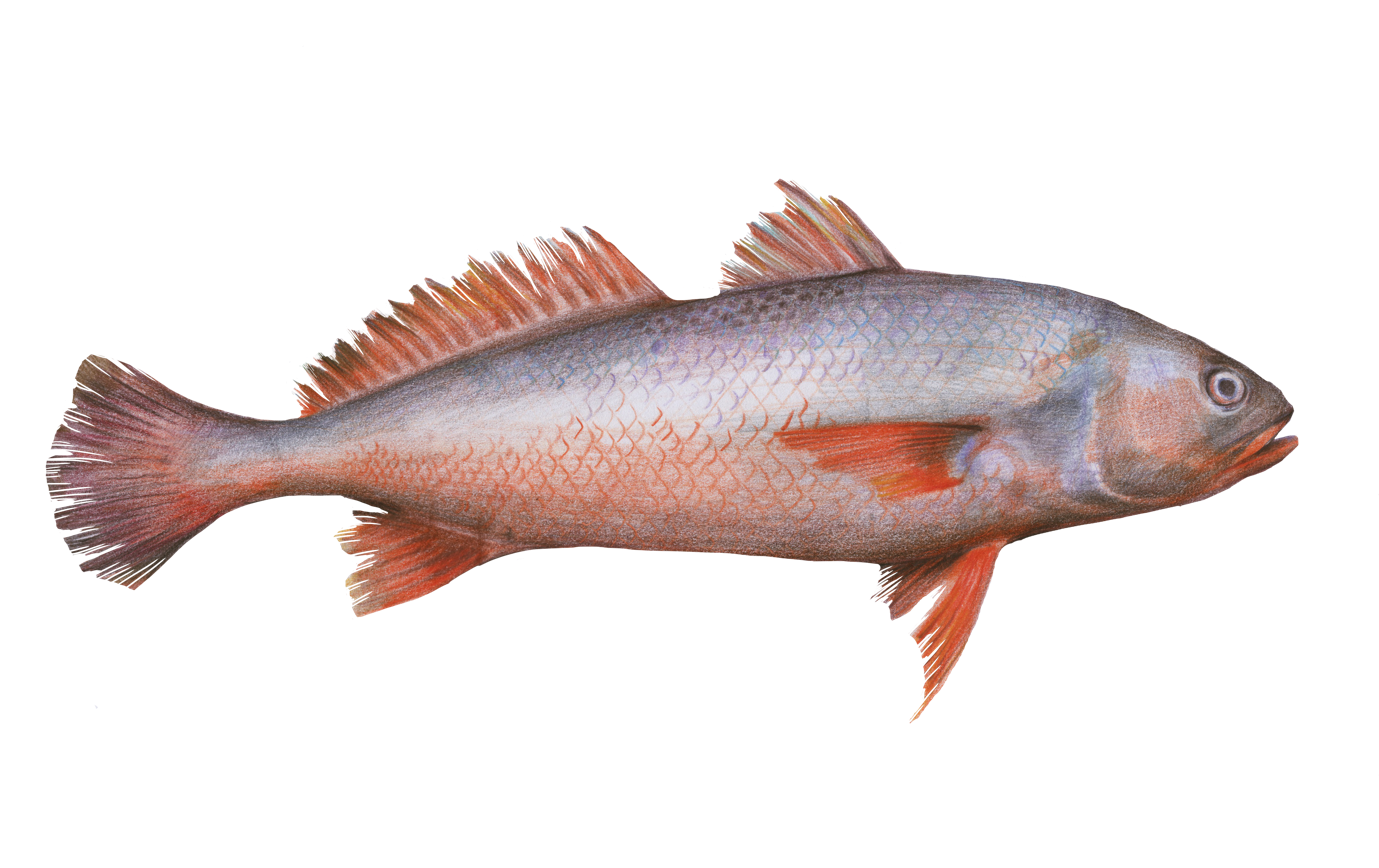

Conservation status
- Vulnerable (IUCN 3.1)

Scientific classification
- Kingdom: Animalia
- Phylum: Chordata
- Class: Actinopterygii
- Division: Teleostei
- Order: Acanthuriformes
- Family: Sciaenidae
- Genus: Cynoscion
- Species: C. acoupa

Binomial name
- Cynoscion acoupa (Lacépède, 1801)

Synonyms
- Cheilodipterus acoupa Lacepède, 1801; Cestrus acoupa (Lacepède, 1801); Lutjanus cayanensis Lacepède, 1802; Otolithus rhomboidalis Cuvier, 1829; Otolithus toeroe Cuvier, 1830; Cynoscion maracaiboensis Schultz, 1949

= Cynoscion acoupa =

Species of fish

Cynoscion acoupa, the acoupa weakfish, blacktail basher or grey snapper, is a species of marine ray-finned fish belonging to the family Sciaenidae, the drums and croakers. This fish is found in the western Atlantic.

== Taxonomy ==
Cynoscion acoupa was first formally described as Cheilodipterus acoupa by the French naturalist Bernard Germain de Lacépède with its type locality given as Cayenne in French Guiana. The genus Cynoscion is classified by the 5th edition of Fishes of the World in the family Sciaenidae, with the croakers and drums.

== Description ==
Cynoscion acoupa has an elongate, torpedo shapes body which is compressed to give it an oval cross-section. The head is low, with the crown being firm to the touch rather than spongy with moderately sized eyes and a large oblique mouth. There are many rows of tiny teeth with a pair of large, pointed canine-like teeth in the front of the upper jaw. The inner row of teeth on the lower jaw gradually get larger towards the rear of the jaw. There are no barbels or pores on the chin. The preoperculum is smooth and the top corner of gill slit is incised. The dorsal fin is long based and is deeply incised with 10 spines in front of the incision and a single spine and between 17 and 22 soft rays, typically 18 to 20. The anal fin is supported by 2 small spines, less than half the length of the first anal fin ray, and 7 to 9, normally 8, soft rays. They have large scales, ctenoid on the body and cycloid on the head. The lateral line reaches to the middle of the end of the caudal fin. The colour of the body is silver and pale yellowish-orange with areas of darker colour along the base of the dorsal fin. The caudal, pelvic and pectoral fins are a darker yellowish-orange colour than that on the body. This fish has a maximum published total length of 110 cm (43 in), although 45 cm (18 in) is more typical, and a maximum published weight of 17 kg (37 lb).

== Distribution and habitat ==
Cynoscion acoupa is found in the Western Atlantic Ocean where it occurs from the estuarine area of Lake Maracaibo in Venezuela to southern Brazil, around 30° South. Records from the Gulf of Venezuela and the Caribbean coast of Colombia and Panama have not been verified. This species occurs at depth down to 45 m (148 ft) in shallow coastal waters in the vicinity of estuaries over sand and mud bottoms. It will enter freshwater.

== Biology ==
Cynoscion acoupa is an oviparous fish which forms spawning aggregations in estuaries and uses estuaries as nursery areas for the juveniles. The adults tend to be found in shallow coastal waters close to estuaries while the juveniles will enter freshwater. They are rather inactive during the day but will hunt for smaller fishes and shrimp in the night.

== Utilisation ==
Cynoscion acoupa is a target species for commercial and artisanal fisheries wherever it occurs. It is highly regarded as a food fish in the fish markets of French Guiana and Guyana. The swim bladder has a high value in the international maw trade, the highest demand being in China, and is traded for supposed nutritional and medicinal properties. It is also used in the production of isinglass. This value in the maw trade has led to increases in illegal fishing.

== Conservation ==
Cynoscion acoupa is highly valued for its flesh and swim bladder, it gathers in large, predictable aggregations and is a large bodied species, characteristics which make it vulnerable to overexploitation. There is evidence of overfishing in that landings have decreased and the effort the catch takes has increased. This in combination with lack of effective protection and continuing illegal fishing has led the IUCN to classify this species as Vulnerable.
