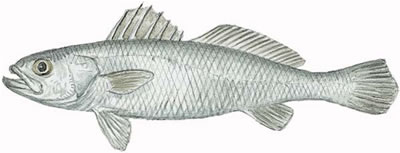

Conservation status
- Least Concern (IUCN 3.1)

Scientific classification
- Kingdom: Animalia
- Phylum: Chordata
- Class: Actinopterygii
- Order: Acanthuriformes
- Family: Sciaenidae
- Genus: Cynoscion
- Species: C. nothus

Binomial name
- Cynoscion nothus (John Edwards Holbrook, 1848)

Synonyms
- Otolithus nothus Holbrook, 1848

= Silver seatrout =

Fish species

The silver seatrout (Cynoscion nothus), also known as white trout, sugar trout, and silver weakfish, is a species of marine ray-finned fish belonging to the family Sciaenidae, the drums and croakers. This fish is found in the Western Atlantic Ocean.

== Distribution ==
The species is found in the western Atlantic, across the eastern areas of coastal North America and in the Bahamas. It occurs in marine and brackish areas normally at depths of 2–18 m, reaching 30 m on occasion. The fish looks like a weakfish or speckled trout without specks or spots across the back. This fish is often easily confused with the sand seatrout. One of the main habitat differences between the two is that this species is more often found in relatively deeper water.

== Description ==
Silver seatrout are largely silver with a dusky gray back and a white belly. Like many weakfish species, they have vampire-like fangs on their upper jaw, well as smaller teeth throughout the entire mouth. Their mouths are also often a bright yellow. Their fins are tinged yellow, except for the upper dorsal fin, which matches the gray color of the back. Adults have an average length of 14–17 cm, and uncommonly up to 36 cm. Individuals generally have a maximum lifespan of two years. Individuals over 36 cm have been occasionally recorded, such as the case in Texas where the state record for a silver seatrout is 24 inches (61 cm).

== Diet ==
Silver seatrout diets consist of crustaceans and small fish.

== Fisheries ==
Silver seatrout are caught mostly in bottom trawls, particularly as bycatch in shrimp fisheries, and with pound nets. No separate statistics are reported for silver seatrout landed and this species is likely to be confused for Cynoscion regalis in landings along the eastern coast of the United States and for C. arenarius in the Gulf of Mexico.
