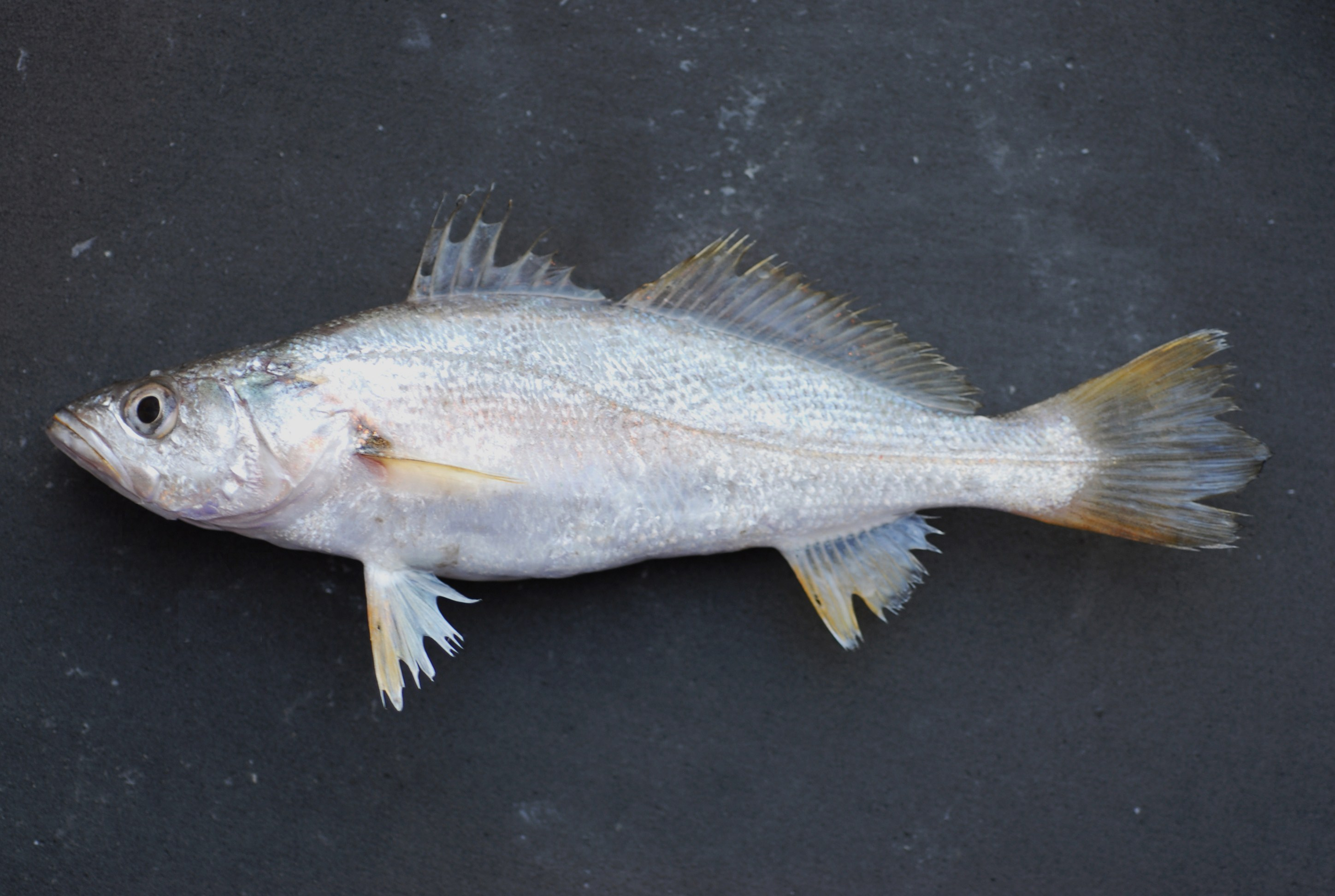

Conservation status
- Least Concern (IUCN 3.1)

Scientific classification
- Kingdom: Animalia
- Phylum: Chordata
- Class: Actinopterygii
- Order: Acanthuriformes
- Family: Sciaenidae
- Genus: Cynoscion
- Species: C. arenarius

Binomial name
- Cynoscion arenarius Ginsburg, 1930

= Cynoscion arenarius =

Species of fish

Cynoscion arenarius, sand seatrout, sand weakfish or white trout, is a species of marine ray-finned fish belonging to the family Sciaenidae, the drums and croakers. It is found in the western Atlantic Ocean. It is closely related to the common weakfish (Cynoscion regalis) and may be a subspecies of C. regalis.

== Taxonomy ==
Cynoscion arenarius was first formally described in 1930 by the American ichthyologist Isaac Ginsburg with its type locality given as Galveston, Texas. The genus Cynoscion is classified by the 5th edition of Fishes of the World in the family Sciaenidae, with the croakers and drums. In Florida this species hybridizes with two other species of Cynoscion, C. regalis and C. nothus, confirmed by genetic studies and some authors suggest that this taxon may actually be a subspecies of the common weakfish (C. regalis) that lacks spots.

== Description ==
Cynoscion arenarius has a body that is elongated and compressed. The upper body is silvery gray foding to silvery in the lower body. The anal and pelvic fins are pale to yellowish and the caudal and the soft-rayed part of the dorsal fin have indistinct spots. The axil of the pectoral fins and the inside of the operculum is dark. The teeth are arranged in many rows with 2 large canines at the front of the upper jaw; while the lower jaw has row of widely spaced larger teeth which grow in size towards the back of the mouth. There are no barbels or pores on the chin but there are 2 marginal pores on the snout. The dorsal fin is incised and there are 9 or 10 spines in the part before the incision and a single spine and between 25 and 29 soft rays to its rear. The anal fin has 2 spines and 9 or 10 spines. This fish has a maximum published total length of 63.5 cm (25.0 in), although 35 cm (14 in) is more typical, and a maximum published weight of 2.8 kg (6.2 lb).

== Distribution and habitat ==
Cynoscion arenarius is found in the western Atlantic Ocean where it occurs from Florida into the Gulf of Mexico as far south as the Bay of Campeche in Mexico and also Belize . This is a demersal fish occurring in shallow coastal waters, including in the surf zone and in estuaries, where there is a sandy substrate at depths down as far as 177 m (581 ft).

== Biology ==
Cynoscion arenarius undertake seasonal migrations to spawn and to avoid high water temperatures. They swim into estuaries in the summer to breed and feed. They feed on fish and crustaceans. Eggs laid in offshore areas where the tidal currents will move them towards the shore. They have a lifespan of up to six years. During courtship and spawning the males produce a purring sound, similar to that of C. regalis, which they create by vibrating a special muscle against their swim bladder. They start to produce sounds at dusk and will do so each night for the length of the spawning season.

== Fisheries ==
Cynoscion arenarius is a target species for both commercial and recreational fisheries in the Gulf of Mexico. It is an economically valuable species in Mexico, particularly in Veracruz, where it is fished for by commercial fisheries using gill net and hook and line. In the United States it is fished for commercially but is not as highly regarded as the spotted seatrout (C. nebulosus).
