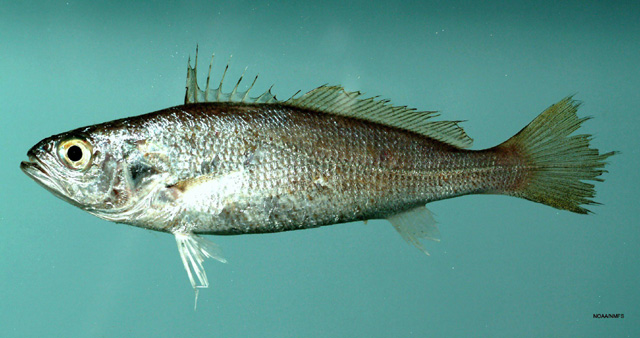

Conservation status
- Endangered (IUCN 3.1)

Scientific classification
- Kingdom: Animalia
- Phylum: Chordata
- Class: Actinopterygii
- Order: Acanthuriformes
- Family: Sciaenidae
- Genus: Cynoscion
- Species: C. regalis

Binomial name
- Cynoscion regalis (Bloch & Schneider, 1801)

= Cynoscion regalis =

Weakfish

Species of fish

Cynoscion regalis, the weakfish, is a marine ray-finned fish of the family Sciaenidae, the drums and croakers.

A medium-large, slender, marine fish, it is found along the east coast of North America. The head and back of this fish are dark brown in color with a greenish tinge. The sides have a faint silvery hue with dusky specks, and the belly is white. The origin of its name is based on the weakness of the mouth muscles, which often cause a hook to tear free, allowing the fish to escape. The weakfish grows to 1 m (3.3 ft) in length and 9 kg (20 lb) in weight. It is found along the eastern coast of North America from Nova Scotia, Canada to northern Florida, where it is fished both commercially and recreationally.

This species has become established in the Gulf of Cadiz in the eastern Atlantic. This introduced population was first noted in 2011 when a specimen misidentified as Cynoscion nebulosus was taken and there is now a well established population.

The weakfish is the state fish of Delaware.

== Names ==
Cynoscion regalis is also known as bastard trout, bastard weakfish, chickwick, common weakfish, gray trout, gray sea trout, gray weakfish, salmon weakfish, saltwater trout, and squeteague.

== Management ==
Cynoscion regalis stocks have been generally low in recent years due to fishing and natural mortality increasing. Management of the species includes gear regulations, seasonal fishing, bycatch limitations, minimum size limits, commercial creel limits, and bycatch reduction gear. It is hoped that these regulations incorporated with others will help weakfish populations come back to a sustainable point.

== Appearance ==
Cynoscion regalis is a salt-water fish native to the mid Atlantic region of the east coast of the United States. Ranging from 12-18 inches once fully matured, with some adults reaching well above this range at up to 3 feet and 18 lbs. The weakfish can live up to 17 years but have an average lifespan of 9 to 12 years (Chesapeake).

== Diet ==
Cynoscion regalis preys on a wide variety of species, including, small schooling fish like anchovies and Atlantic Menhaden, assorted crabs, shrimp, mollusks, and even large zooplankton. Weakfish move toward their prey slowly and once upon them they attack aggressively with an open jaw (Chesapeake). Although predatory and on a higher trophic level, weakfish are also a food source for other, larger fish. Some examples of fish that prey on weakfish include the bluefish, the striped bass, and the dusky shark (Chesapeake).

== Breeding ==
Cynoscion regalis mainly spawn from April to August. This spawning takes place in the shallow waters of estuaries. Their young are in the form of zooplankton, floating freely with the tidal current. They flow with these currents until reaching their nursery area of low salinity rivers. Once these fish grow large enough in these areas, they begin to migrate back to the saltier waters to which they were spawned. They stay in these intertidal bay zone until winter, then join the schooling fish towards deeper offshore waters. The males have the ability to perform a deep croaking sound as shown by the Chesapeake Bay field guide (Chesapeake). The reason why these fish have the capability to do this is because they are a part of the drum family. This trait is very common in species that belong to the drum family and is commonly used for mating purposes. It is believed that weakfish also use this to attract other females as stated in a study done at the University of Michigan, "There is some evidence that the male weakfish croaking sound may be used in attracting a mate and playing a role in the spawning behavior. This is because the male's sonic muscles, which are used to produce 'drumming' and 'croaking' sounds, increases three times its usual mass during spawning season" (Gillum). This study shows that weakfish make use of their drum sound more frequently during the mating season, suggesting that it is used as a process for males to attract females.

== Behavior ==
Cynoscion regalis are schooling fish, meaning that they spend a large majority of their time swimming together either trying to evade larger predators, or trying to feed more efficiently on prey. Studies done by the university of Michigan state that these schooling patterns tend to become much tighter in signs of stress as they state, "weakfish have an acute chemosensory response mechanism. In times of stress, weakfish gather into tighter schools, this was seen in lab studies when higher temperatures were used. The weakfish under these conditions showed a 35% decrease in their distance to the other fish in the school. Also the frequency of school formation increased in response to stress" (Gillum). Weakfish school closer together when in situations of high stress in this study done by the university of Michigan. Theorizing that they use schooling as a form of protection.

== Economic importance ==
Cynoscion regalis is excellent table fare; they can be used as a food source. The weakfish are recreationally fished and provide tackle shops with business.

== Recreational fishing ==
Cynoscion regalis are finicky. They are very shy and prey selective; making them a harder fish to target recreationally, this provides a good challenge for anglers. They prefer a water temperature ranging from 50 degree F to 65 degrees F. This is the best time to target weakfish, as they are most actively breeding within these temperatures. They can be found feeding in temperatures exclusive to these numbers, but they may be much more finicky and hard to hook. The weakfish also have a very fragile mouth, making it hard for anglers to keep them from spitting the hook.

== Conservation ==
Cynoscion regalis has its main breeding grounds in the near shore estuaries of the Chesapeake Bay. "The most important habitat for the weakfish is the brackish waters of the Chesapeake bay" (Gillum). This is where the vast majority of weakfish breed, to maintain a healthy population of weakfish these areas must be preserved. The weakfish experienced a crash that was recognized in 2009 as stated by John McMurray in the Theodore Roosevelt Conservation Partnership, "A 2009 stock assessment found that weakfish were badly depleted. The stock had reached an all-time low of 2.9 million pounds, far below the "biomass threshold" of 22.4 million pounds, which is what scientists would consider a healthy stock. This is an astonishing drop, since the East Coast harvest in 1980 was 80 million pounds" (McMurray).

Natural mortality of this species has increased since the mid 1990s from 0.16 to an average of 0.93 from 2007 to 2014 but the underlying cause is still unknown. Given the decline in SSB in excess of 60% over three generation lengths and the unknown driver of increasing natural mortality, this species is listed as Endangered A2b with an urgent need for additional research to determine the driver of increasing natural mortality.

== Current fishing regulations ==
Cynoscion regalis is a target for the recreational anglers and each individual state has its own size limit, possession limit, and season for targeting and collecting weakfish. For example, in the state of New Jersey, recreational anglers are allowed 1 fish that is greater than 13 inches at any time of the year as shown by the New Jersey Department of Environmental protection (NJ wildlife). Under Florida regulations weakfish are considered partially regulated, but there is a 100 lbs limit of unregulated fish including sand seatrout and silver seatrout per day outside of the Weakfish Management Zone. The Weakfish Management Zone includes state waters from the Florida-Georgia line to the southernmost tip of Amelia Island, the inland waters of Nassau County and the St. Marys River. The regulations in the zone are to protect mainly the purebred weakfish, as they are relatively rare in Florida outside of this zone. Sand seatrout and silver seatrout are species of least concern.

== In human culture ==
Cynoscion regalis is the state fish of Delaware.
