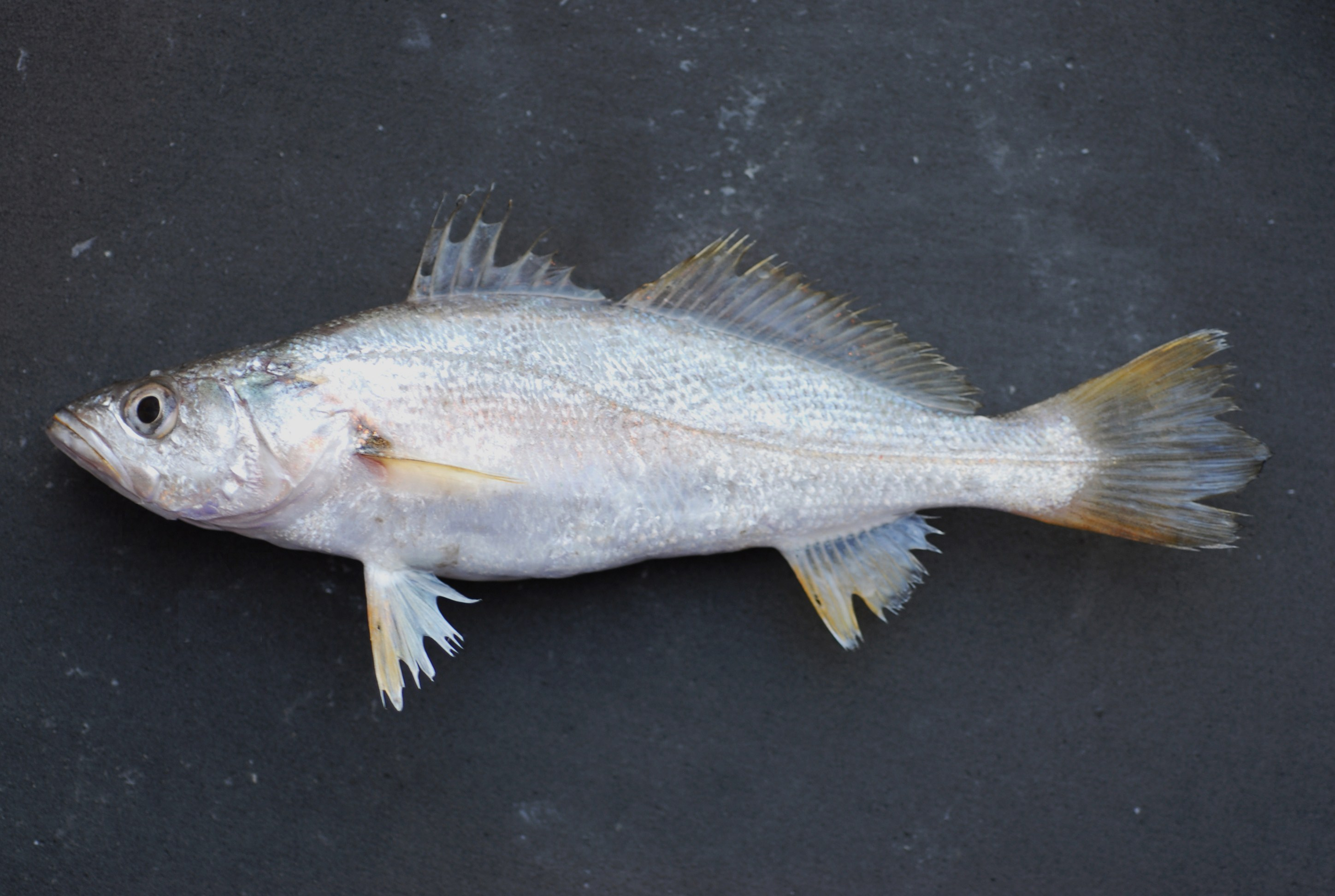
- Cynoscion arenarius

Scientific classification
- Kingdom: Animalia
- Phylum: Chordata
- Class: Actinopterygii
- Order: Acanthuriformes
- Family: Sciaenidae
- Genus: Cynoscion; Gill, 1861

Type species
- Johnius regalis Bloch & Schneider, 1801

Synonyms
- Apseudobranchus Gill, 1862; Archoscion Gill, 1862; Buccone Jordan & Evermann, 1896; Cestrius Gronow, 1854; Erescion Jordan & Evermann, 1927; Paralarimus Fowler & B. A. Bean, 1923; Symphysoglyphus Miranda-Ribeiro, 1913

= Cynoscion =

Genus of fishes

Cynoscion is a genus of marine ray-finned fish belonging to the family, Sciaenidae, the drums and croakers. These fish are found off the coasts of North and South America in the western Atlantic and eastern Pacific Oceans. Many fish in this genus have been given the common name weakfish.

== Taxonomy ==
Cynoscion was first proposed as a monospecific genus in 1861 by the American biologist Theodore Gill with Johnnius regalis, a species originally described in 1801 from New York by Marcis Elieser Bloch and Johann G. T. Schneider, designated as its type species. This genus has been placed in the subfamily Cynoscioninae by some workers, but the 5th edition of Fishes of the World does not recognise subfamilies within the Sciaenidae which it places in the order Acanthuriformes.

== Etymology ==
Cynoscion is a combination of cyno, meaning "dog", a reference to the pair of canine-like teeth in the upper jaw, with scion, the modern Greek name of Umbrina cirrosa, which Gill preferred over sciaena because he did not like the sound of Cynosciaena. The common name, weakfish, is a reference to the easily torn membrane in the mouth of C. regalis.

== Species ==
The genus consists of 25 species:

- Cynoscion acoupa (Lacépède, 1801) (Acoupa weakfish)
- Cynoscion albus (Günther, 1864) (Whitefin weakfish)
- Cynoscion analis (Jenyns, 1842) (Peruvian weakfish)
- Cynoscion arenarius (Ginsburg, 1930) (Sand seatrout)
- Cynoscion guatucupa (Cuvier, 1830) (Stripped weakfish)
- Cynoscion jamaicensis (Vaillant and Bocourt, 1883) (Jamaica weakfish)
- Cynoscion leiarchus (Cuvier, 1830) (Smooth weakfish)
- Cynoscion microlepidotus (Cuvier, 1830) (Smallscale weakfish)
- Cynoscion nannus (Castro-Aguirre & Arvizu-Martinez, 1976) (Dwarf weakfish)
- Cynoscion nebulosus (Cuvier, 1830) (Spotted seatrout)
- Cynoscion nortoni (Béarez, 2001) (Hake weakfish)
- Cynoscion nothus (Holbrook, 1848) (Silver seatrout)
- Cynoscion othonopterus (Jordan and Gilbert, 1882) (Gulf weakfish)
- Cynoscion parvipinnis (Ayres, 1861) (Shortfin corvina)
- Cynoscion phoxocephalus (Jordan and Gilbert, 1882) (Cachema weakfish)
- Cynoscion praedatorius (Jordan and Gilbert, 1889) (Boccone weakfish)
- Cynoscion regalis (Bloch and Schneider, 1801)(Squeteague)
- Cynoscion reticulatus (Günther, 1864)
- Cynoscion similis (Randall and Cervigón, 1968) (Tonkin weakfish)
- Cynoscion squamipinnis (Günther, 1867) (Scalyfin corvina)
- Cynoscion steindachneri (Jordan, 1889) (Smalltooth weakfish)
- Cynoscion stolzmanni (Steindachner, 1879) (Yellowtail corvina)
- Cynoscion striatus (Cuvier, 1829) (Striped weakfish)
- Cynoscion virescens (Cuvier, 1830) (Green weakfish)
- Cynoscion xanthulus Jordan & Gilbert, 1882 (Orangemouth weakfish)

FishBase treats C. striatus as a valid species but the Catalog of Fishes states that this is a nomen oblitum and is in the synonymy of C. guatucupa.

== Characteristics ==
Cynoscion weakfishes have an elongate, torpedo-shaped body which is compressed to give it an oval cross-section. The head is low, with the crown being firm to the touch rather than spongy with moderately sized eyes and a large oblique mouth. There is a pair of large, pointed canine-like teeth in the front of the upper jaw. There are no barbels or pores on the chin. The preoperculum is smooth and not serrated and the top corner of gill slit is incised. The dorsal fin is long based and is deeply incised with between seven and nine thin spines and between 20 and 30 soft rays. The anal fin is supported by two small spines, less than half the length of the first anal fin ray, and 7 to 13 soft rays. They have large scales, ctenoid on the body and cycloid on the head. The lateral line reaches to the middle of the end of the caudal fin. The largest species in the genus are C. albus which has a maximum published total length of 130 cm (51 in) and C. xanthulus at 129 cm (51 in) while the smallest is C. nannus reaching 27 cm (11 in).

== Distribution ==
Cynoscion weakfishes are found off the Americas in the eastern Pacific and western Atlantic Oceans being found in tropical and warm temperate waters.
