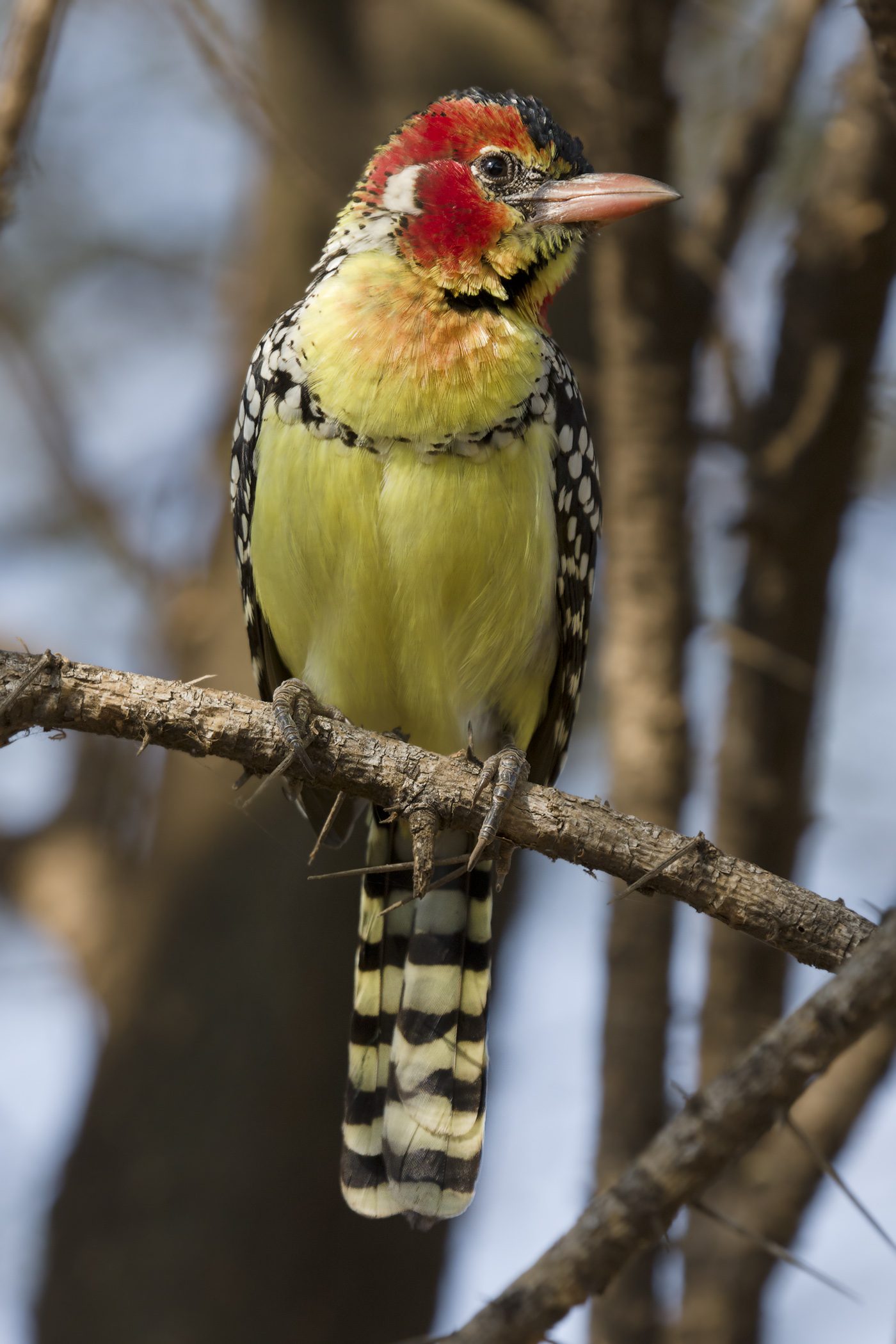
- Adult male nominate near Lake Manyara, Tanzania

Conservation status
- Least Concern (IUCN 3.1)

Scientific classification
- Kingdom: Animalia
- Phylum: Chordata
- Class: Aves
- Order: Piciformes
- Family: Lybiidae
- Genus: Trachyphonus
- Species: T. erythrocephalus

Binomial name
- Trachyphonus erythrocephalus Cabanis, 1878

Subspecies
- T. e. erythrocephalus; T. e. shelleyi; T. e. versicolor

= Red-and-yellow barbet =

Species of bird

The red-and-yellow barbet (Trachyphonus erythrocephalus) is a species of African barbet found in eastern Africa. Males have distinctive black (spotted white), red, and yellow plumage; females and juveniles are similar, but less brightly colored. The species lives in broken terrain and nests and roosts in burrows. Omnivorous, the species feeds on seeds, fruit, and invertebrates. Where not hunted, they are tame, but their feathers are used by certain tribes, such as the Maasai.

== Description ==
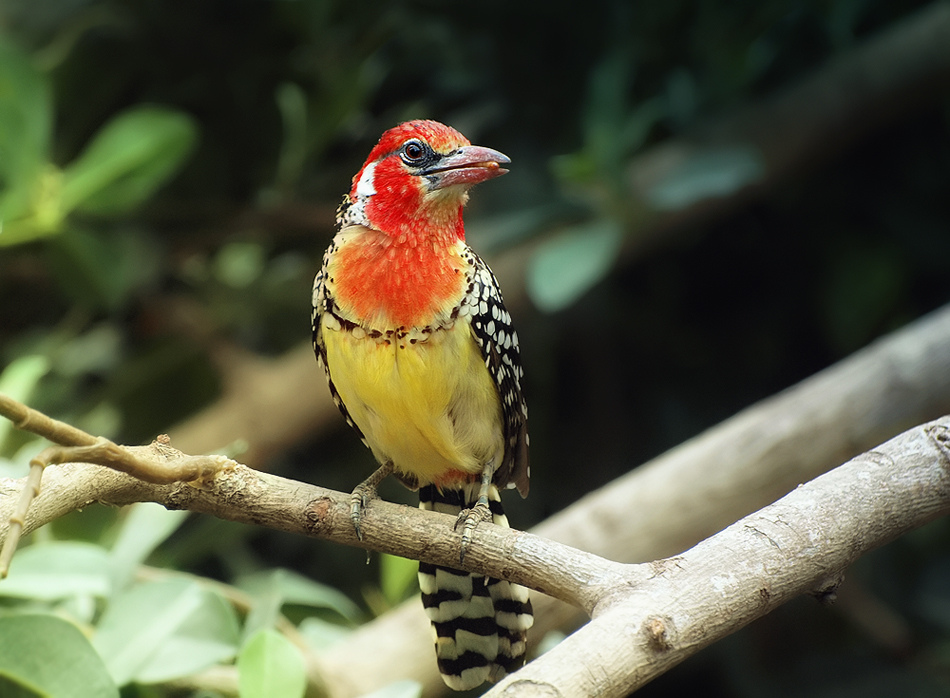
Adult female nominate

Red-and-yellow barbet adult males have distinctive plumage made up black with spotted white, red and yellow. It has a black forehead and crown with a slight crest. The nape is orange and red with black spots. The side of the neck is red, going into yellow. The back is mostly black with white spots. The tail is a blackish brown with up to eight cream spots forming bars. The under side of the tail is yellow with black bars. The chin and throat are yellow, and there is a black patch at the centre of the throat. The throat is bordered by areas with more orange areas. The breast is orange to red-orange, becoming more yellow at the sides, with a dark band with white spots crossing through the middle. The lower breast and belly are yellow. The wings are black with brown wing feathers. All feathers on the wing have white spots, giving a spotted or banded appearance. The long beak is typically red. The skin around the eyes is a dark grey or black, while the eyes themselves can be a yellow brown, a dark brown, a red brown or a shade in between. The legs are a blue-grey, and the feet are the same colour.

Song of a red-and-yellow barbet

The female is similar to the male, but is, overall, much duller, with less red and orange, and more yellow and white. Specifically, females lack the throat patch, and typically lack the crown. Young birds are also duller- they typically have less red and orange, as with the female. The spots on the back are less white, and all blacks are more brown. The eyes are typically grey.

== Distribution and habitat ==
The nominate subspecies, T. e. erythrocephalus, is found from central Kenya to north-east Tanzania. T. e. versicolor is found in southeast South Sudan, northeast Uganda, southwest Ethiopia and north Kenya. T. e. shelleyi is found in Somalia and eastern Ethiopia.

The species avoids both very open areas and areas of dense woodland, instead preferring broken terrain such as riverbeds and cliffs or termite mounds. It nests and roosts in tunnels, and forages on or close to the ground.

== Diet ==
Red-and-yellow barbets are omnivores, feeding on seeds, fruit, and invertebrates.

== Gallery ==
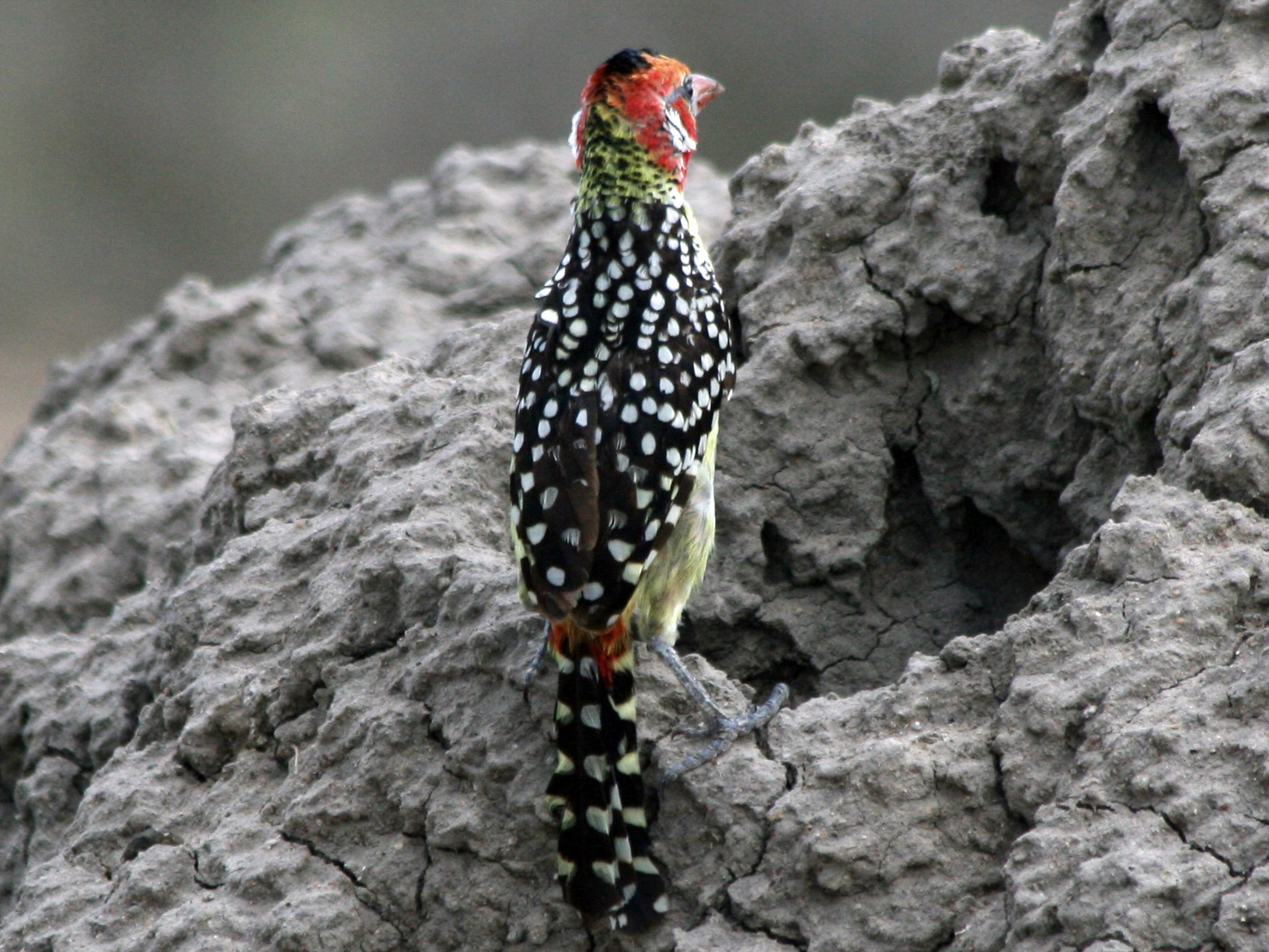
The back is mostly black with white spots.

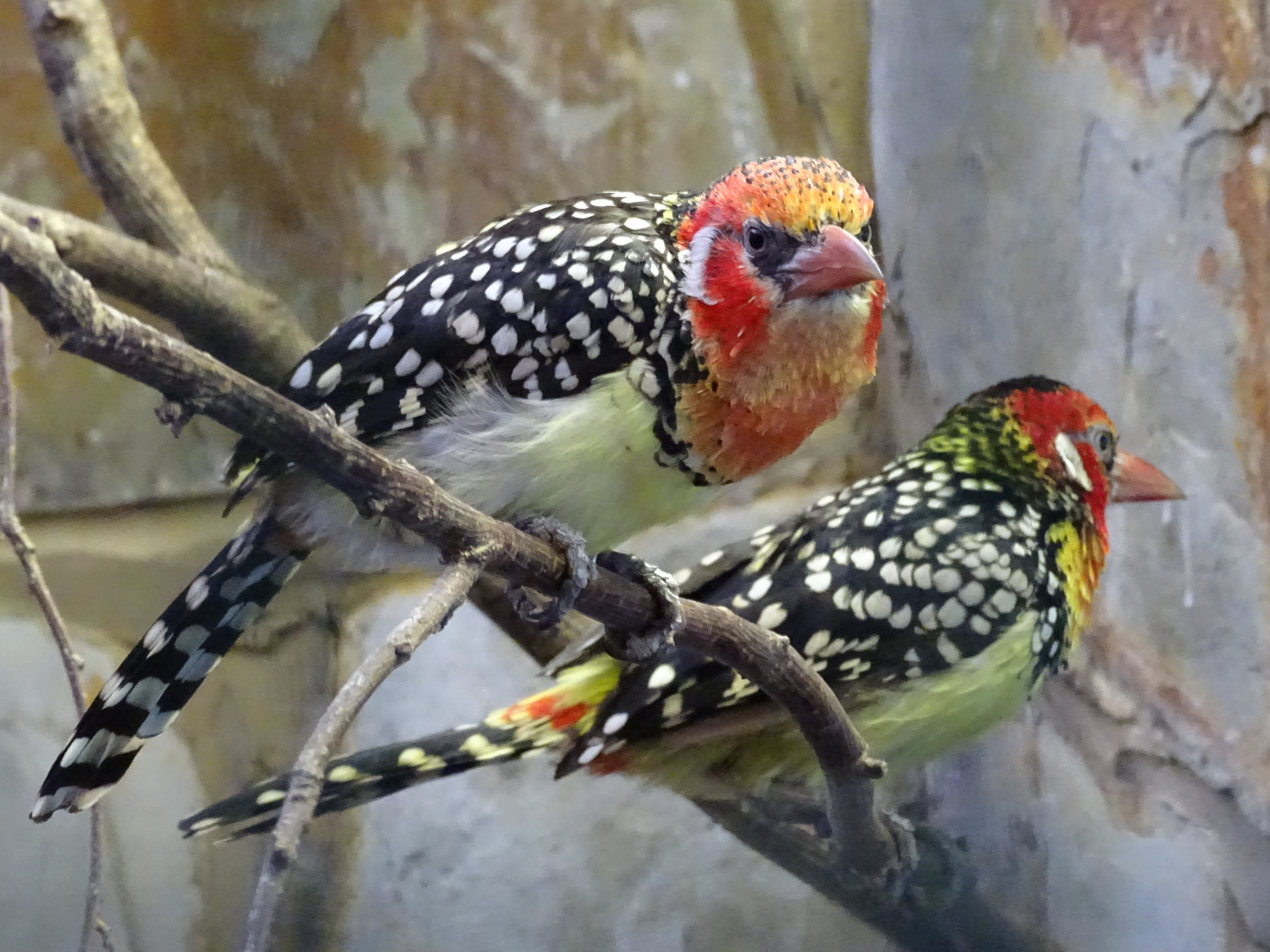
At Birdworld, Farnham

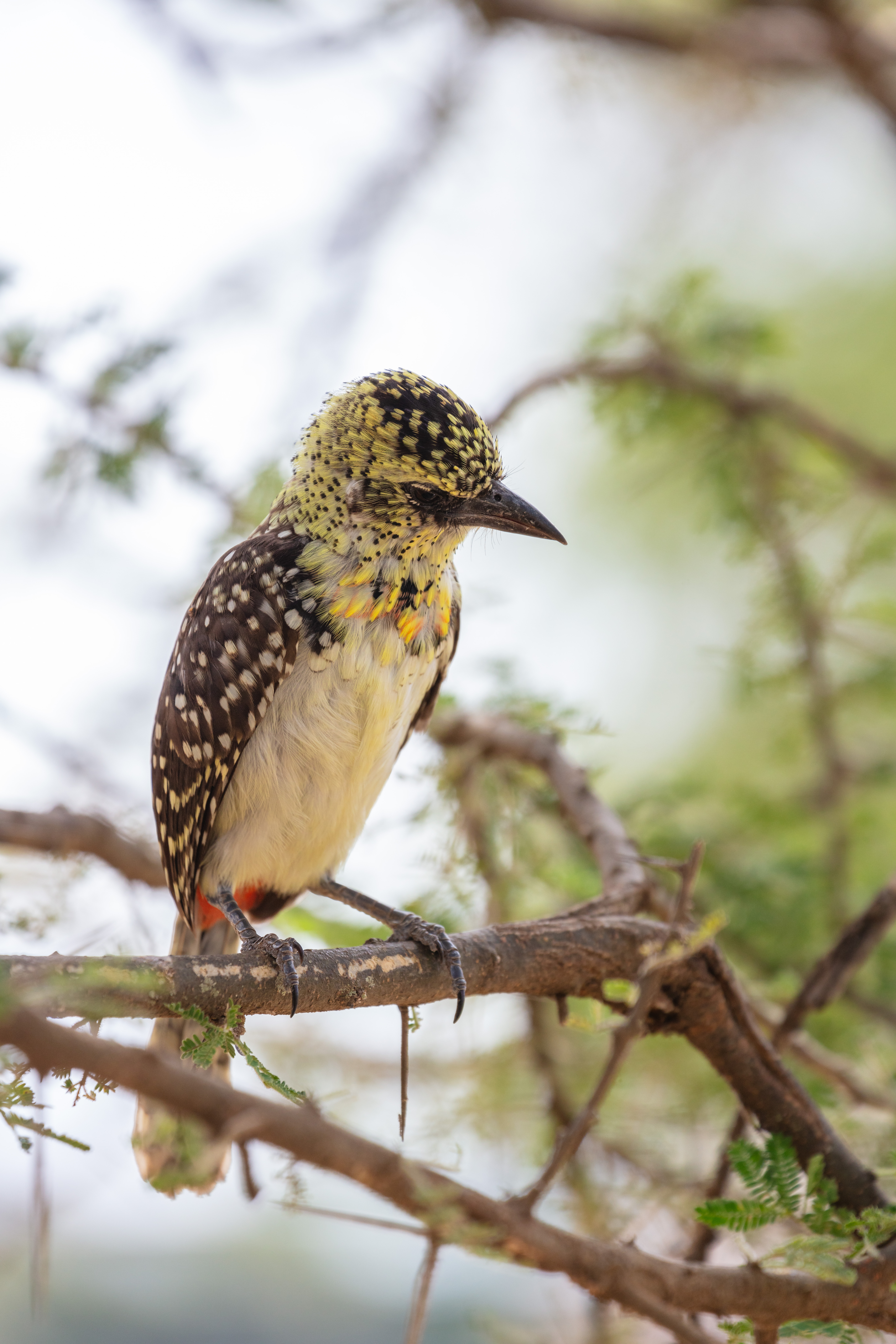
At Serengueti, Tanzania

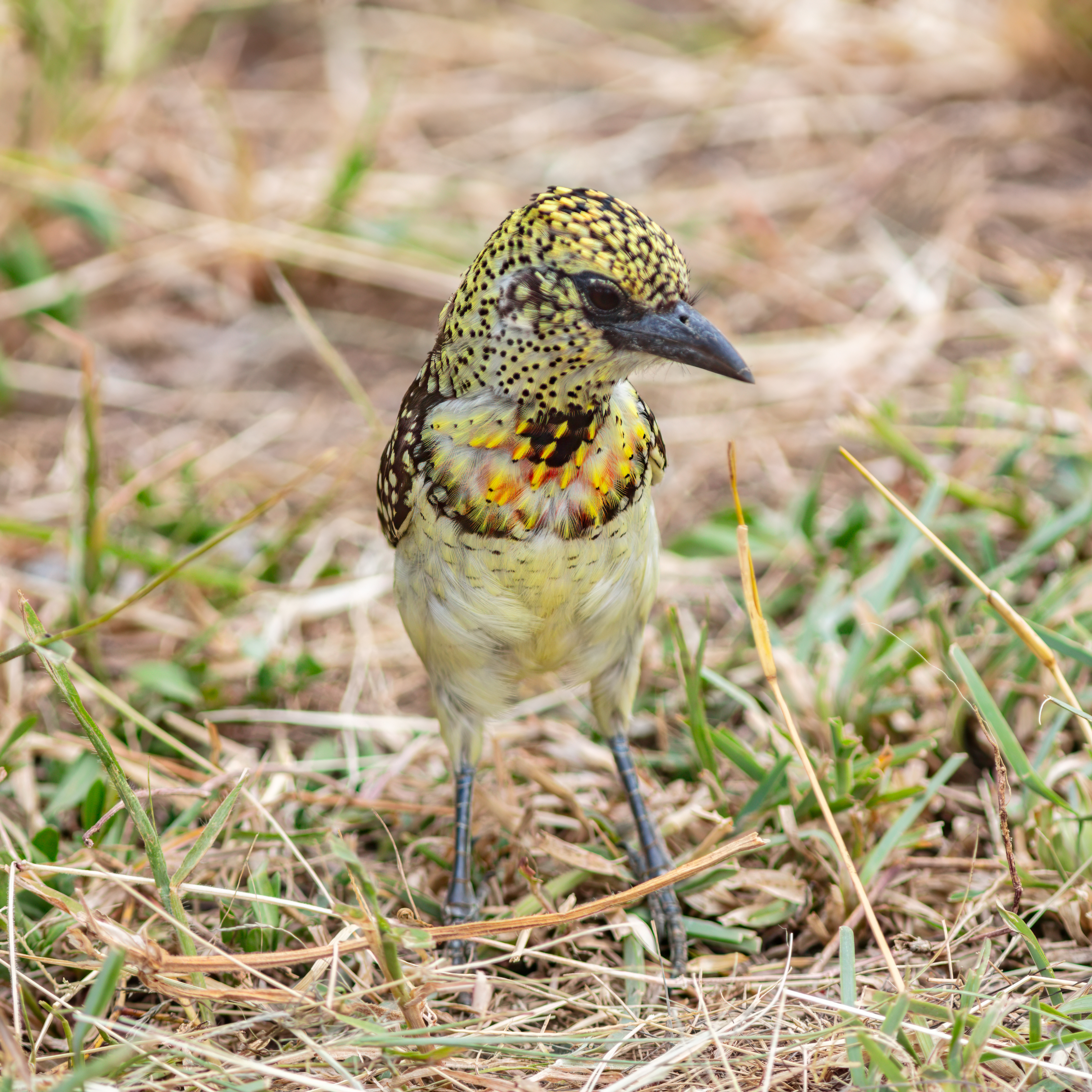
At Tarangire, Tanzania

At Amboseli, Kenya
