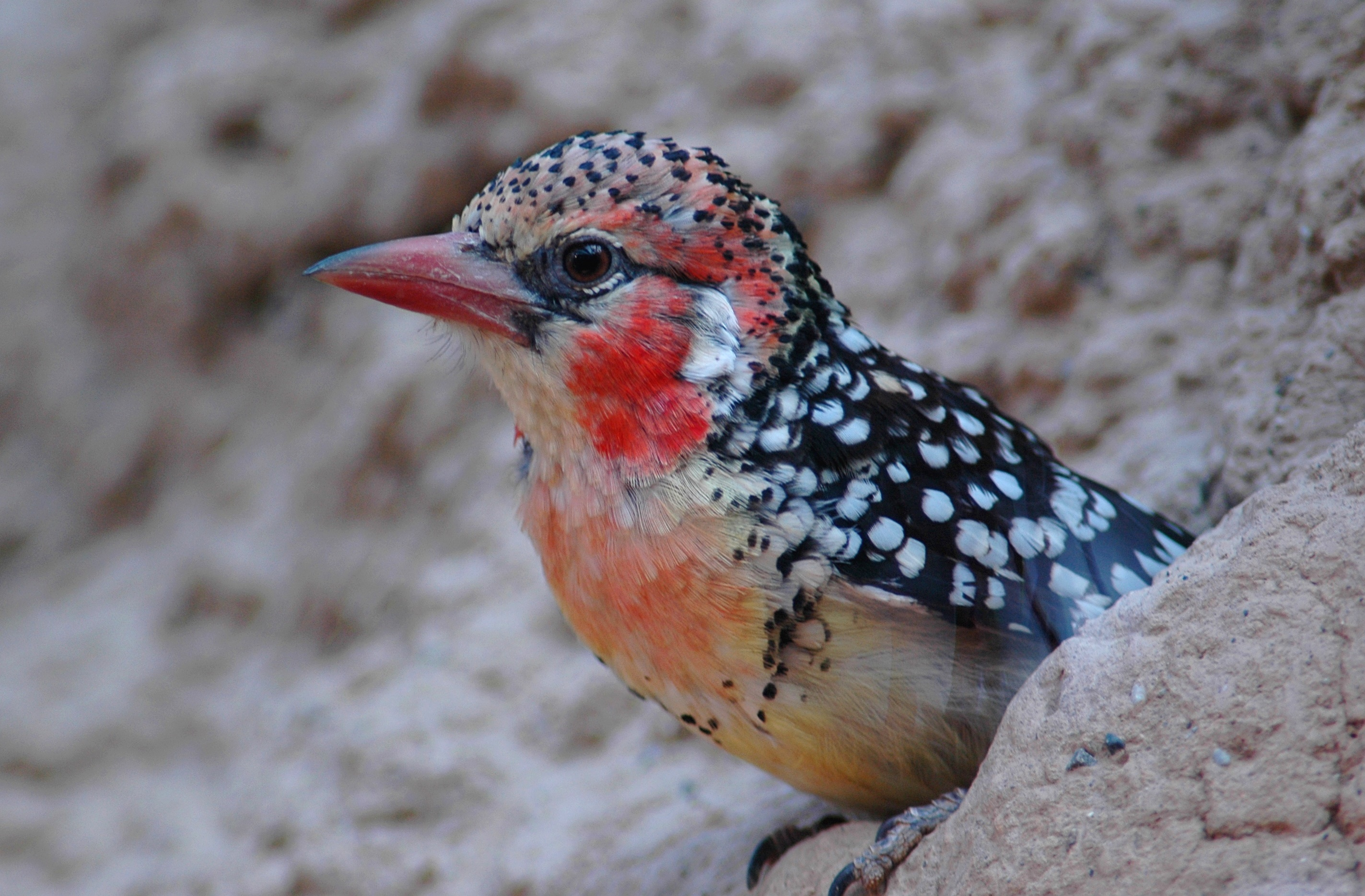
- Red-and-yellow barbet Trachyphonus erythrocephalus

Scientific classification
- Kingdom: Animalia
- Phylum: Chordata
- Class: Aves
- Order: Piciformes
- Family: Lybiidae
- Subfamily: Trachyphoninae
- Genus: Trachyphonus; Ranzani, 1821

Type species
- Trachyphonus vaillantii Ranzani, 1821

= Trachyphonus =

Genus of birds

The African terrestrial barbets are the bird genus Trachyphonus in the African barbet family (Lybiidae), which was formerly included in the Capitonidae and sometimes in the Ramphastidae. These birds are more terrestrial than the other African barbets and differ in some other respects too; they are thus separated in the subfamily Trachyphoninae.

== Taxonomy ==
The genus Trachyphonus was introduced in 1821 by the Italian naturalist Camillo Ranzani to accommodate a single species, Trachyphonus vaillantii, the crested barbet. This is the type species. The genus name is from Ancient Greek τραχυφωνος/trakhuphōnos meaning "harsh-voiced", from τραχυς/trakhus meaning "rough" and φωνη/phōnē meaning "sound" or "cry".

The genus contains four species:

Image	Common name	Scientific name	Distribution
	Crested barbet	Trachyphonus vaillantii	Angola, Botswana, Burundi, Democratic Republic of the Congo, Eswatini, Malawi, Mozambique, Namibia, Rwanda, South Africa, Tanzania, Uganda, Zambia, and Zimbabwe.
	Yellow-breasted barbet	Trachyphonus margaritatus	Burkina Faso, Chad, Djibouti, Eritrea, Ethiopia, Mali, Mauritania, Niger, Nigeria, Somalia, and Sudan.
	Red-and-yellow barbet	Trachyphonus erythrocephalus	Kenya to north-east Tanzania.
	D'Arnaud's barbet	Trachyphonus darnaudii	West Africa

== Extinct taxa ==
The Early to Middle Miocene genus Capitonides from Europe, as well as "CMC 152", a distal carpometacarpus from the Middle Miocene locality of Grive-Saint-Alban (France), have been placed in this genus, but this move is not widely accepted. In the case of "CMC 152", this may be more warranted as this fragment differs from Capitonides and is more similar to extant (presumably Old World) barbets.
