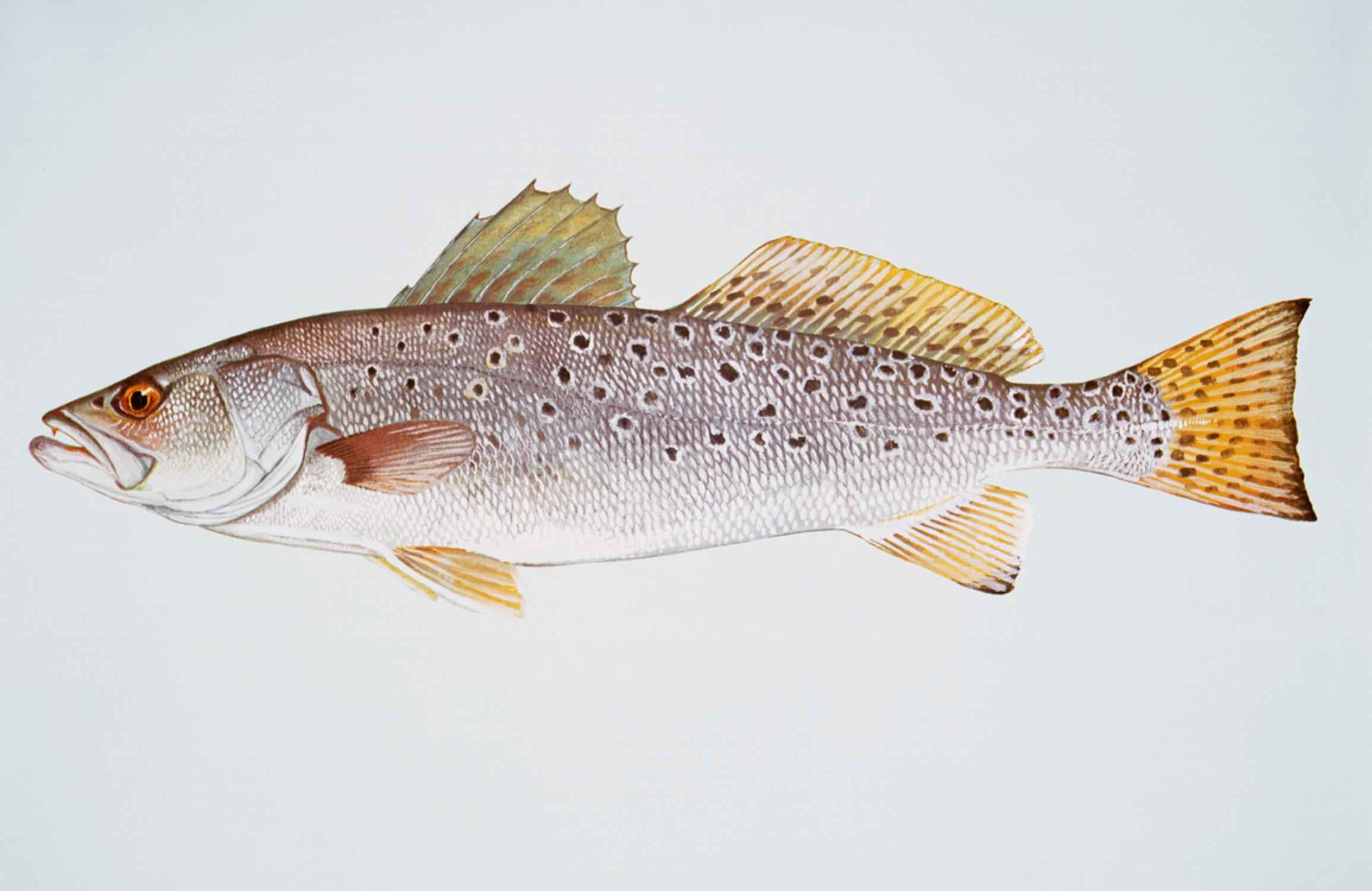

Conservation status
- Least Concern (IUCN 3.1)

Scientific classification
- Kingdom: Animalia
- Phylum: Chordata
- Class: Actinopterygii
- Division: Teleostei
- Order: Acanthuriformes
- Family: Sciaenidae
- Genus: Cynoscion
- Species: C. nebulosus

Binomial name
- Cynoscion nebulosus (Cuvier, 1830)

Synonyms
- Otolithus nebulosus Cuvier, 1830; Otolithus carolinensis Valenciennes, 1833

= Cynoscion nebulosus =

Species of fish

Spotted seatrout (Cynoscion nebulosus), also known as speckled trout, is a common estuarine fish found in the southern United States along coasts of Gulf of Mexico and the coastal Atlantic Ocean from Maryland to Florida. While most of these fish are caught on shallow, grassy flats, spotted seatrout reside in virtually any inshore waters, from the surf of outside islands to far up coastal rivers, where they often come for shelter during cold weather. Contrary to its name, the spotted seatrout is not a member of the trout family (Salmonidae), but of the drum family (Sciaenidae). It is popular for commercial and especially recreational fishing in coastal waters of the southeastern United States. Adults reach 19–37 inches in length and 3–17 pounds in weight.

== Distribution and habitat ==
Spotted seatrout live in the top of the water column and are most numerous along the coasts of the southeastern states, such as Texas, Louisiana, Alabama, Mississippi, Georgia, and Florida. They are also common along the coasts of North and South Carolina and Virginia. Estuarine coasts are prime settlement areas. They are uncommonly seen north of Delaware Bay and along the coast of Cape Cod, Massachusetts. They are most abundant in the mid-Atlantic and southeastern regions of the United States. Speckled trout prefer water temperatures between 59 °F and 86 °F and are typically found in waters with salinities between 5 and 35 ppt.

=== Migration ===
During the winter months, speckled trout move offshore to deeper waters, but return to the estuaries and coastal waters during the spring and summer months.

== Characteristics ==
Spotted seatrout is the common name endorsed by the American Fisheries Society. However, this fish has many other common names, including speckled trout, speck, speckles, spec, truite gris (Louisiana French), trucha de mar (Mexican Spanish), spotted weakfish, spotted seateague, southern seateague, salmon, salmon trout, simon trout, winter trout, seatrout, Nosferatu fish, and black trout. Particularly large ones are nicknamed gator trout.

The spotted seatrout has prominent canine teeth. Like other fish of the family Sciaenidae, it has an elongated, soft dorsal fin with scales; it is separated from the spinous dorsal fin by a deep notch. It usually has two anal spines and the lateral line extends to the tip of the caudal fin. The back has distinct spots scattered on it, including on the dorsal and caudal fins. Unlike some other members of the family Sciaenidae, the spotted seatrout does not have any chin barbels. In stained water, this fish's background may take on a golden hue. Its shape and coloration is reminiscent of a brown trout. This fish is closely related to the weakfish, Cynoscion regalis.

The average size of spotted seatrout is 0.5–1.0 kg (1.1–2.2 lb), but in most areas fish up to 2.5 kg (5.5 lb) are fairly common. Fish weighing 3.5–4.5 kg (7.7–9.9 lb) are rare. The world record is 7.9 kg (17 lb 7 oz).

== Food ==
Small trout eat large amounts of shrimp and other crustaceans. As they grow larger, their diets shift toward fish, the larger, the better. Studies in Texas and Mississippi show that really big trout strongly prefer to feed on mullet; a large trout will find the largest mullet it can handle and try to swallow it. Often the mullet is half or two-thirds as large as the trout.

== Reproduction and growth ==
Like all members of the drum family, mature males make a "drumming" sound to attract females during the spawning season. Spotted seatrout have a long spawning season from spring through summer.

Larval seatrout reach 5–7 mm in length about two weeks after hatching, and 170–200 mm within about seven months. It takes between one and two years for seatrout to reach 300 mm (about 12 inches) and between two and three years to reach 400 mm in length (about 16 inches). The maximum age of spotted seatrout that have been caught is estimated to be 12 years old, though that is rare, and the oldest fish caught on a regular basis are closer to four or five years old.

By the end of the first year, spotted seatrout are about 250 mm long and about half of them are mature enough to reproduce. They reproduce in shallow, grassy areas of estuaries.

As spotted seatrout grow longer, they increase in weight. The relationship between weight and length is not linear. The relationship between total length (in millimeters) and weight (in grams) can be expressed by an equation of the form:

$W = cL^b\!\,$

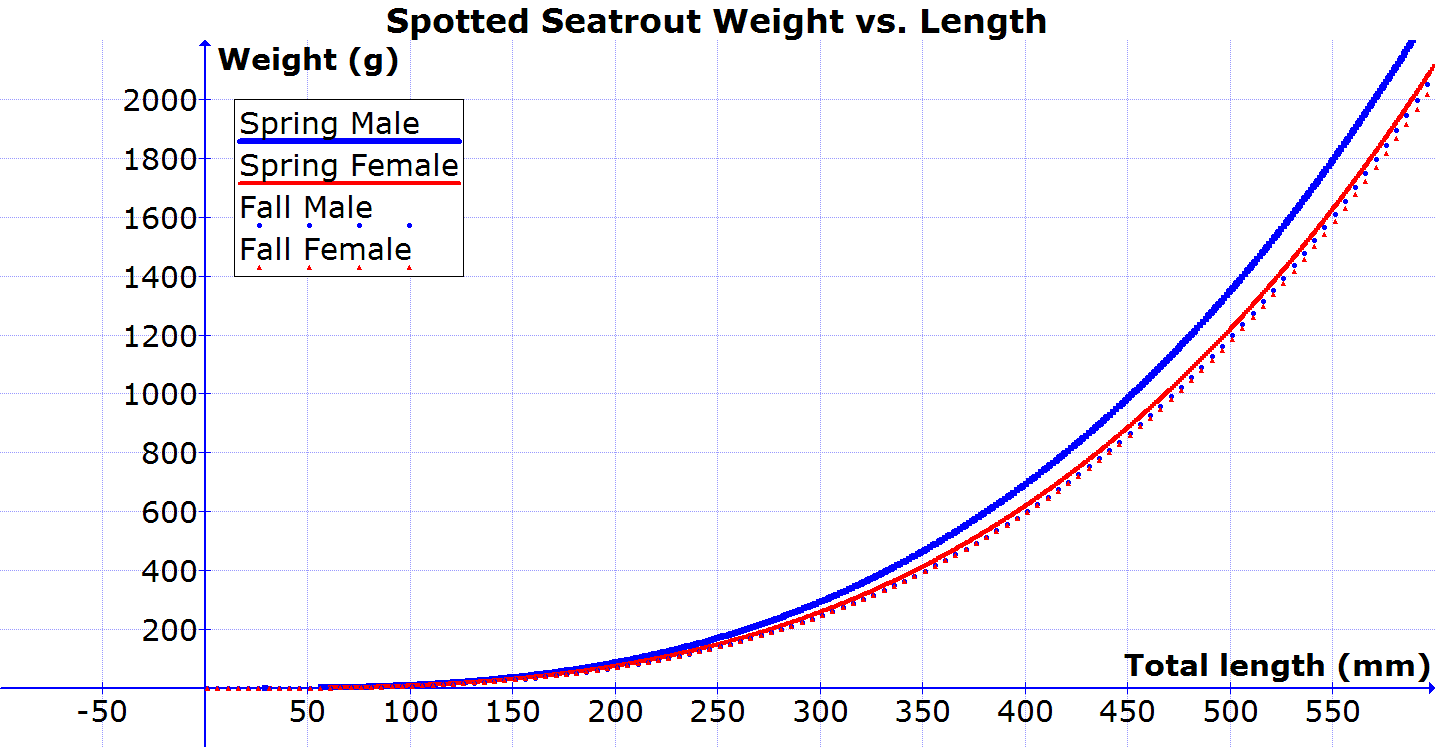
Spotted seatrout weight vs. length

Invariably, b is close to 3.0 for all species, and c is a constant that varies among species. The coefficient c and the exponent b are found by fitting an equation of this form to measured weight-length data. For some fish, including spotted seatrout, the weight-length relationships vary with the seasons and with gender. Jenkins reported slightly different relationships for male and female spotted seatrout, and for fall and spring:

Fall/male: W = 0.00000534L^{3.093}

Spring/male: W = 0.000011535L^{2.989}

Fall/female: W = 0.000006252L^{3.066}

Spring/female: W = 0.000007834L^{3.035}

Only the relationship for male spotted seatrout in the spring appears noticeably different from the others on a graph.

== Fishing ==
While spotted seatrout are caught by both commercial and recreational fishermen, recreational fishing represents the vast majority of the catch. Almost all spotted seatrout are caught with hook and line, as many places have banned fishing for them with gillnets.

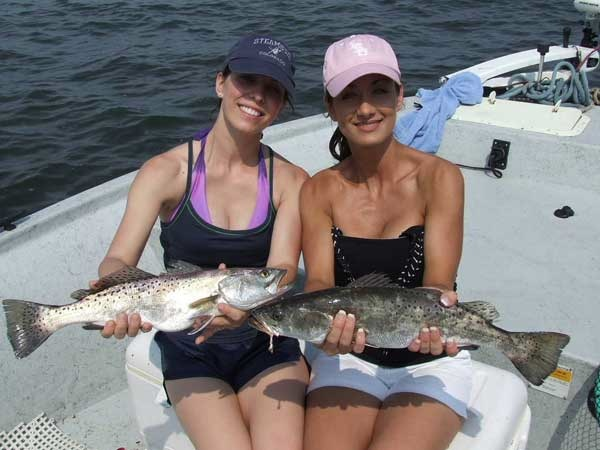
Spotted seatrout are among the top ten species for recreational fishing in the United States.

According to the NOAA, spotted seatrout are in the top ten species for recreational fishing in the United States. From 1993 – 2003, recreational fishermen in Louisiana harvested more than 6 million spotted seatrout each year. Along the coasts of North Carolina and Virginia, more than half a million speckled trout were caught by recreational fishermen each year between 2005 and 2008. Nevertheless, because they reproduce so well, spotted seatrout is listed as a "best choice" for sustainable seafood in Louisiana and Florida by the Monterey Bay Aquarium's Seafood Watch.

== Management ==
The management of the species is limited to size and possession limits, but programs have been initiated to gather more information on their overall health and abundance.
