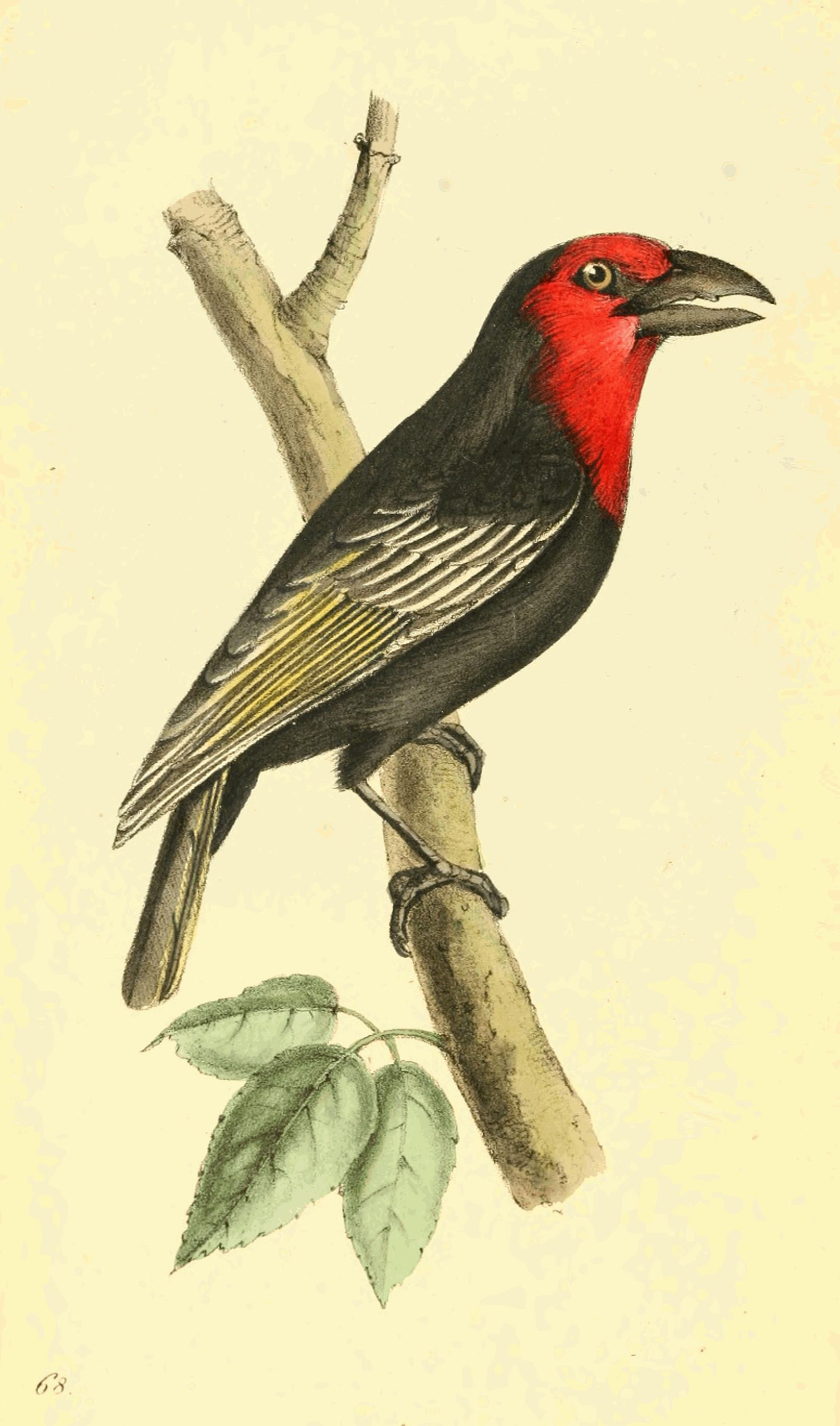

Conservation status
- Least Concern (IUCN 3.1)

Scientific classification
- Kingdom: Animalia
- Phylum: Chordata
- Class: Aves
- Order: Piciformes
- Family: Lybiidae
- Genus: Lybius
- Species: L. guifsobalito

Binomial name
- Lybius guifsobalito Hermann, 1783

= Black-billed barbet =

Species of bird

The black-billed barbet (Lybius guifsobalito) is a species of bird in the Lybiidae family.

== Distribution ==
This species has an extremely large range in the Afrotropical realm. It is present in Cameroon, northeastern Democratic Republic of the Congo, Eritrea, from eastern Sudan to western Ethiopia, western Kenya, northern Tanzania, and Uganda.

== Habitat ==
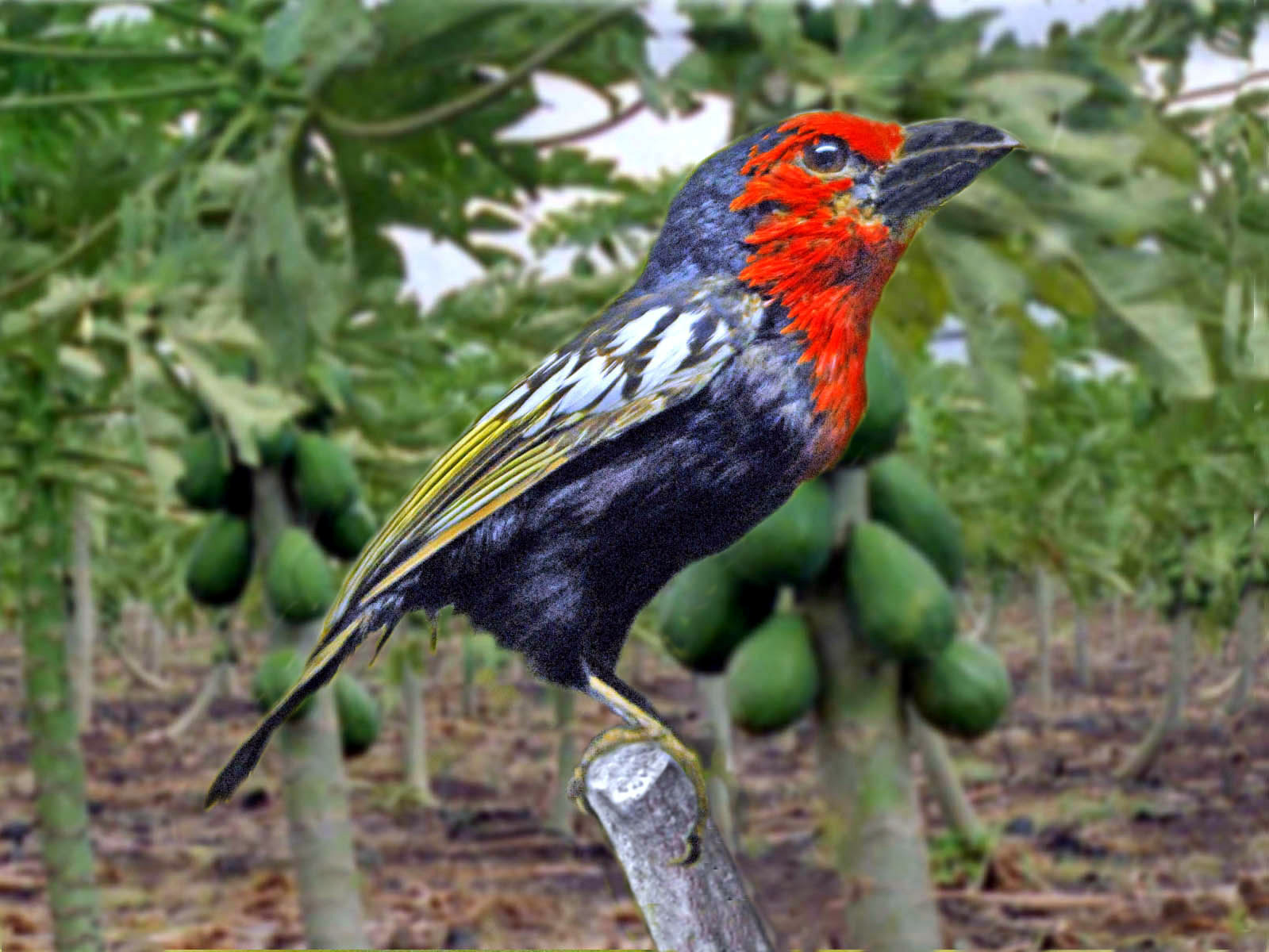
Lybius guifsobalito. Photomontage of Museum specimen

These birds occur at altitudes between 900 and 2,200 meters above sea level, in open forests, forest edges, woodland vegetation, savannah, scrubs, gardens and cultivated areas with fruit-bearing trees.

== Description ==
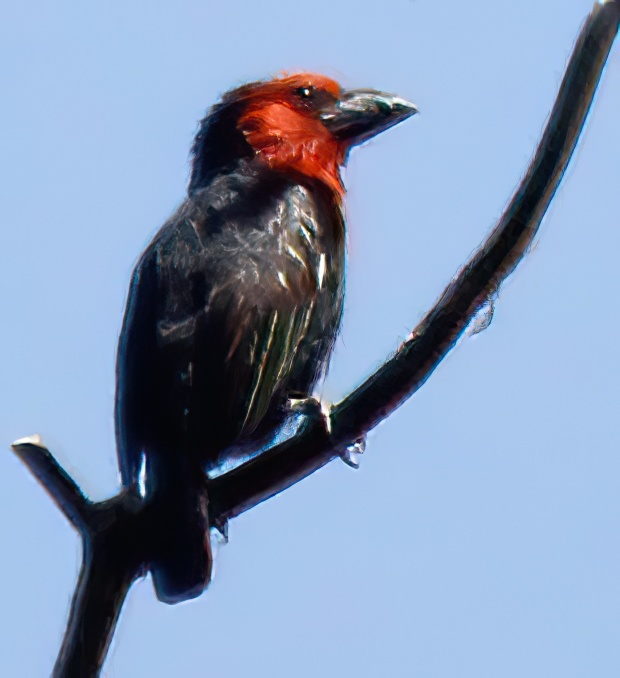
Lake Victoria - Kenya

Lybius guifsobalito can reach a wingspan of 7.9–9.4 cm (3.1–3.7 in) in males. The tail length is between 4.5 and 5.4 centimeters. The beak reaches a length between 1.9 and 2.2 centimeters. Females have similar body measurements, without noticeable sexual dimorphism.

Males and females of these medium-sized barbets are glossy blue-black, the wings and the belly are a little more brown. They also have a bright red or red-orange face, throat and upper chest. The upperwing are narrowly lined with yellow to white. The beak is rather strong and black, the featherless skin of the face is gray, the eyes are reddish brown. The legs and feet are blackish gray. Young birds have duller plumage than the adult ones.

It is closely related to Lybius torquatus and Lybius rubrifacies.

== Biology ==
Lybius guifsobalito is an adaptable species . The diet of these birds consists mainly of fruits such as figs, guavas, papaya and various berries. They also eat insects such as beetles, ants, and termites. They usually live in pairs or small groups, up to seven individuals. The vocalization comprehends a low growling and a series of two-syllabled "koop-pup" phrases.
