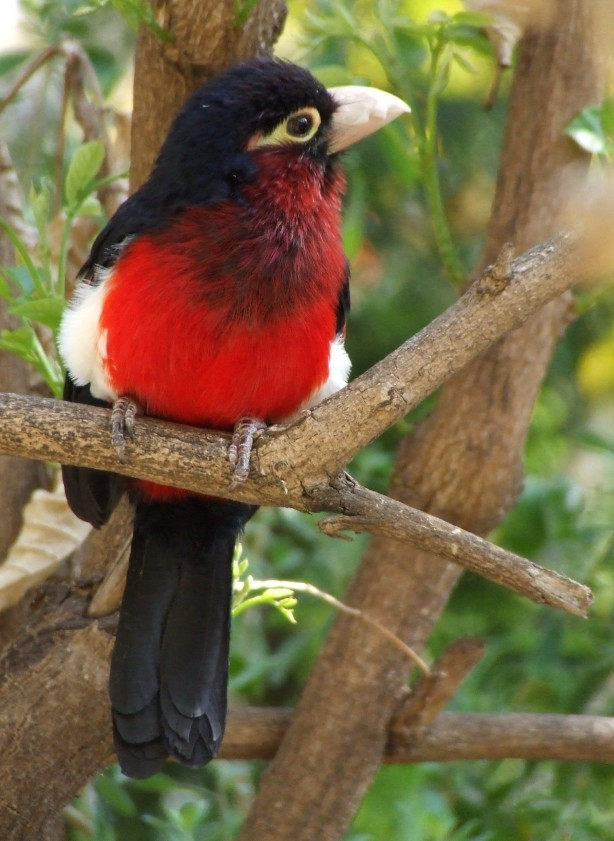

Conservation status
- Least Concern (IUCN 3.1)

Scientific classification
- Kingdom: Animalia
- Phylum: Chordata
- Class: Aves
- Order: Piciformes
- Family: Lybiidae
- Genus: Pogonornis
- Species: P. bidentatus

Binomial name
- Pogonornis bidentatus (Shaw, 1799)

Synonyms
- Bucco bidentatus Shaw, 1799; Melanobucco aequatorialis Shelley, 1889; Lybius bidentatus (Shaw, 1799)

= Double-toothed barbet =

Species of bird

The double-toothed barbet (Pogonornis bidentatus) is a species of bird in the family Lybiidae. It is found in Angola, Benin, Burundi, Cameroon, Central African Republic, Republic of the Congo, Democratic Republic of the Congo, Ivory Coast, Equatorial Guinea, Ethiopia, Gabon, Ghana, Guinea, Guinea-Bissau, Kenya, Liberia, Mali, Nigeria, Rwanda, Sierra Leone, South Sudan, Tanzania, Togo, and Uganda. Within Pogonornis bidentatus, there are two subspecies: Pogonornis bidentatus bidentatus and Pogonornis bidentatus aequatorialis.

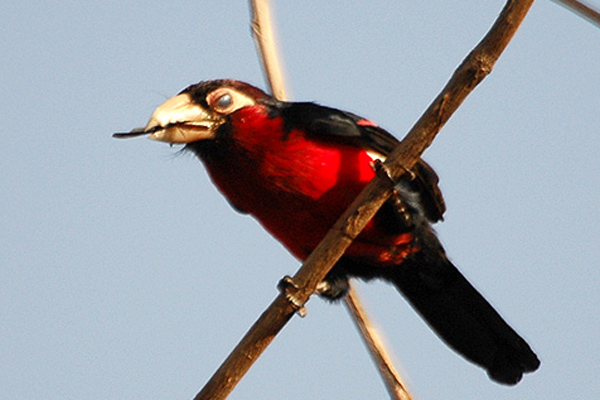
Photographed at Entebbe, Uganda

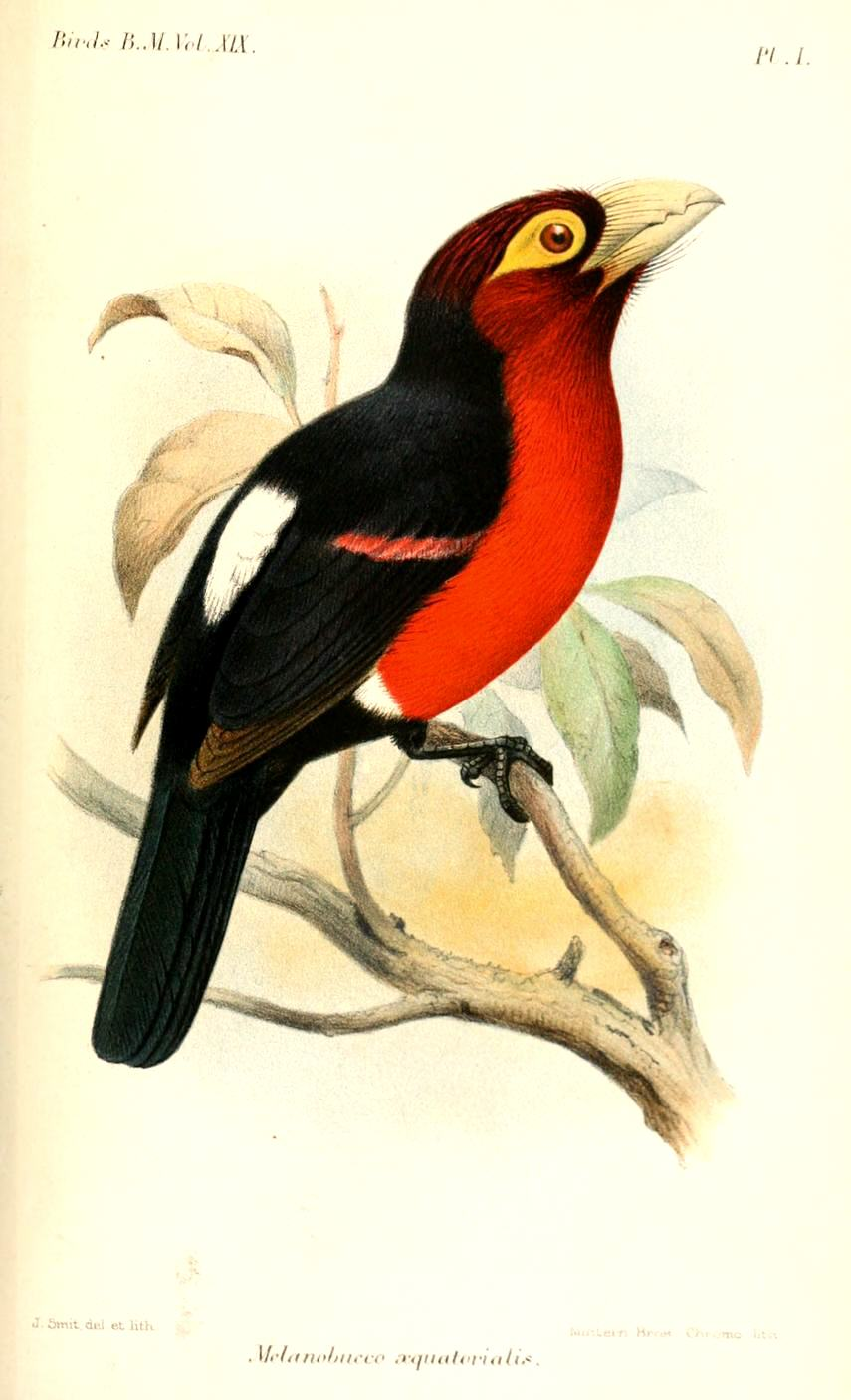
Illustration by Keulemans, 1891

== Description and habitat ==
Pogonornis bidentatus is a barbet with black and red coloring. Its bill is large and off-white, and the skin around its eyes is yellow. The double-toothed barbet is black on the top side of its body with a patch of white feathers on its back. Its breast is red, with a white patch on its side. Females and males have similar markings, except that females have lines of black feathers on the white side patch. Juveniles of the species are duller; their feathers are dark grey.

Its song is somewhat like a cat's purr. Sometimes pairs of double-toothed barbets will sing together.

Double-toothed barbets generally live in the understory of dense woodland. They occupy the edges of the woods, riparian forest, and secondary forest. Some may go into gardens and forage for fruit.

The double-toothed barbet is most likely to be confused with the black-breasted barbet or the bearded barbet. In flight, it's ungraceful.

== Behavior and diet ==
Pogonornis bidentatus eats fruits and insects. They search in the foliage for food, usually staying below ten meters. Of insects, they eat beetles, termites, ants, and Hemiptera, which they find in the tree bark or in clusters of leaves. Often a double-toothed barbet will capture winged ants or termites while in flight. They also eat fruits: figs, papayas, avocados, and the fruits of the umbrella tree Musanga cecropioides and of Solanum. Double-toothed barbets will eat the seeds of some fruits.

These barbets can be found in pairs or small family groups with helpers; lone double-toothed barbets are rare. Their territories are large.

Double-toothed barbets roost communally, as all the barbets in a group roost in the same hole. Nests are made by excavating a tree, often rotting, at above two metres (7 ft). Both barbets in a pair will dig out the nesting hole, and both will defend it. The entrance to the nest is circular, five or more centimetres across. Some nests have an entrance tunnel. At maximum, a nest is 46 cm (18 in) deep.

== Breeding ==
When a male double-toothed barbet displays for a female, he swings his tail and body around. He also shows the patches of white feathers on his flank. The courting birds will preen each other and go back and forth. The male will sometimes tap a nest entrance to attract the female toward it.

Breeding happens year-round. The female lays between two and four eggs, which are white. Incubation of the eggs lasts for about 13 days. At first, adult birds feed the hatchlings insects, then later mostly fruit. The hatchlings' parents and the helpers remove faeces from the nest. After 37 to 39 days, the hatchlings fledge.
