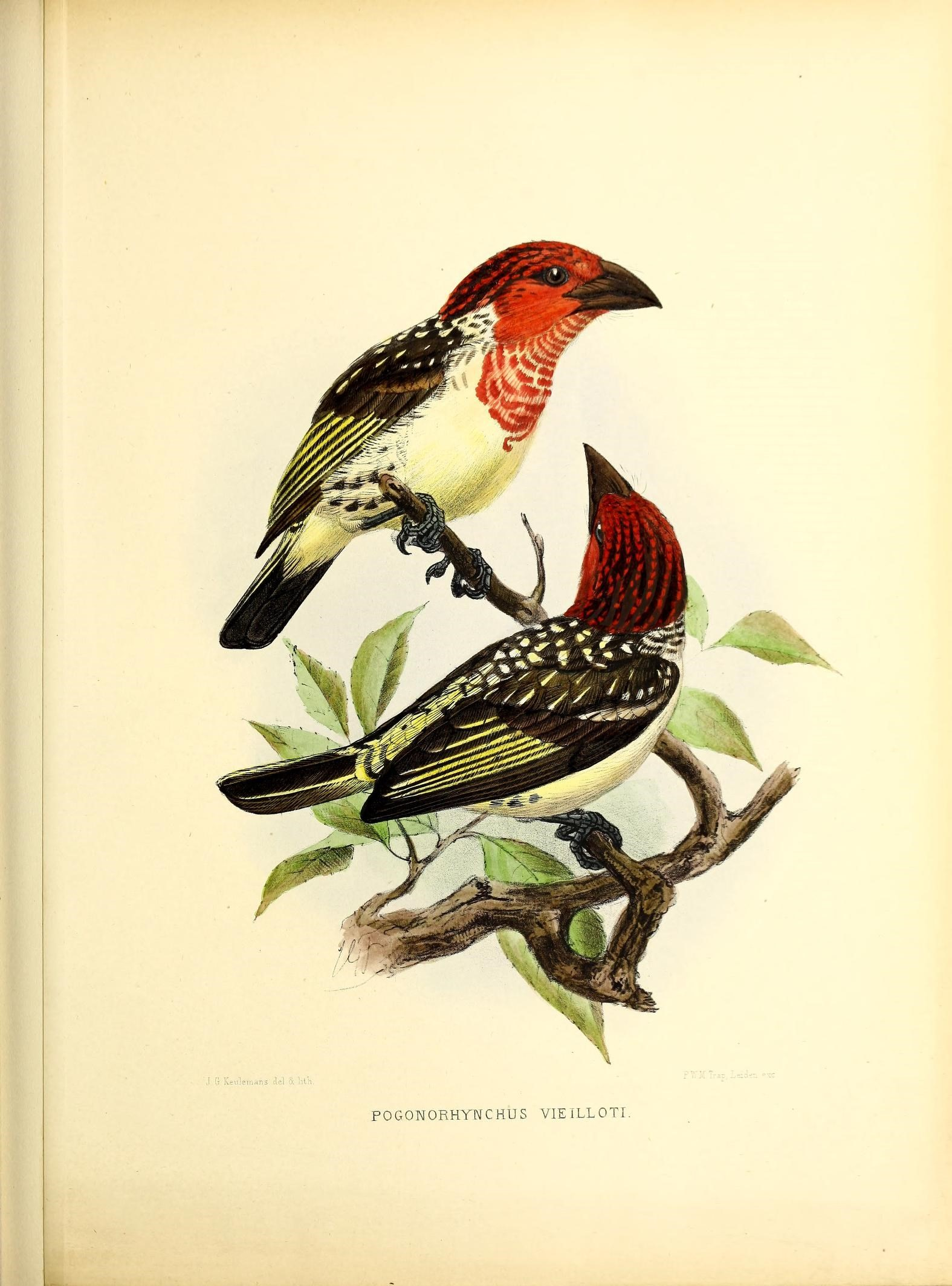

Conservation status
- Least Concern (IUCN 3.1)

Scientific classification
- Kingdom: Animalia
- Phylum: Chordata
- Class: Aves
- Order: Piciformes
- Family: Lybiidae
- Genus: Lybius
- Species: L. vieilloti

Binomial name
- Lybius vieilloti (Leach, 1815)

Subspecies
- Lybius vieilloti buchanani - Hartert, 1924; Lybius vieilloti rubescens - (Temminck, 1823); Lybius vieilloti vieilloti - (Leach, 1815)

= Vieillot's barbet =

Species of bird

Vieillot's barbet (Lybius vieilloti) is a small bird in the family Lybiidae. Barbets are a group of birds with a pantropical distribution which get their name from the bristles which fringe their heavy bills. This bird is named after the French ornithologist Louis Pierre Vieillot.

== Habitat ==
The Vieillot's barbet is a resident breeder in the African scrubland on the southern edge of the Sahara Desert from Senegal to Ethiopia. It is often found along wooded creeks in Zaria, Nigeria and its breeding season takes place during the months of April to July. It is an arboreal species of savannah and farmland which eats insects and fruit, especially figs. It nests in a tree hole, laying three eggs.

== Description ==
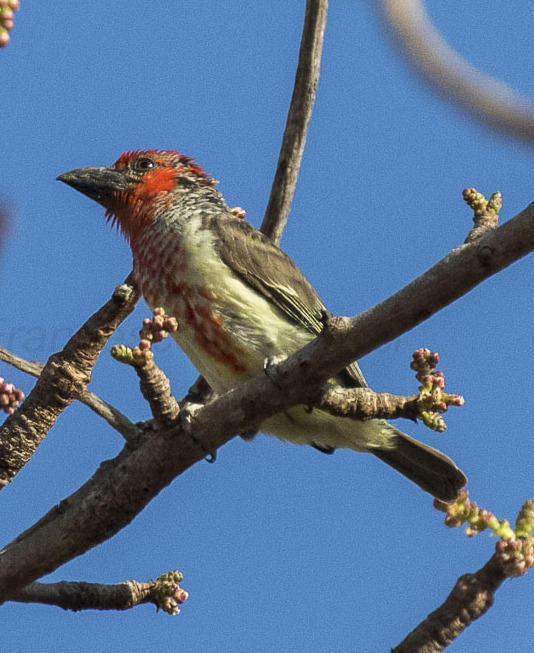
Vieillot's Barbet in Gambia

This is a sparrow-sized barbet at 15 cm (5.9 in). It is a plump bird, with a short neck, large head and short tail. The adult has a red head, and the neck and breast are a mixture of red and white. The upperparts are dark brown apart from a yellow stripe down the back. The rest of the underparts are yellowish with dark flank spotting. The bill is thick and dark grey. Sexes are similar, but immature birds are duller.

== Calls ==
This species of African barbet is known to duet year-round, unlike other species that only duet during breeding season. The L. vieilloti has been reported to "yodel", which is a succession of two flute-like notes which are uttered by two birds sitting on a bough as they bow ceremoniously to each other. This yodel is immediately answered by the other bird of the pair with the sound "poop-poop". The duet seems to be initiated by a snarl like the Lybius torquatus. The duets are considered quite unusual because the birds call with different rhythms. Other duetting pairs have occasionally accompanied or followed the original duetting pair. This species uses simultaneous polyphonic duets with a pre-duet greeting ceremony. Polyphonic duets have many sounds occurring simultaneously so the song sounds "many-voiced".
