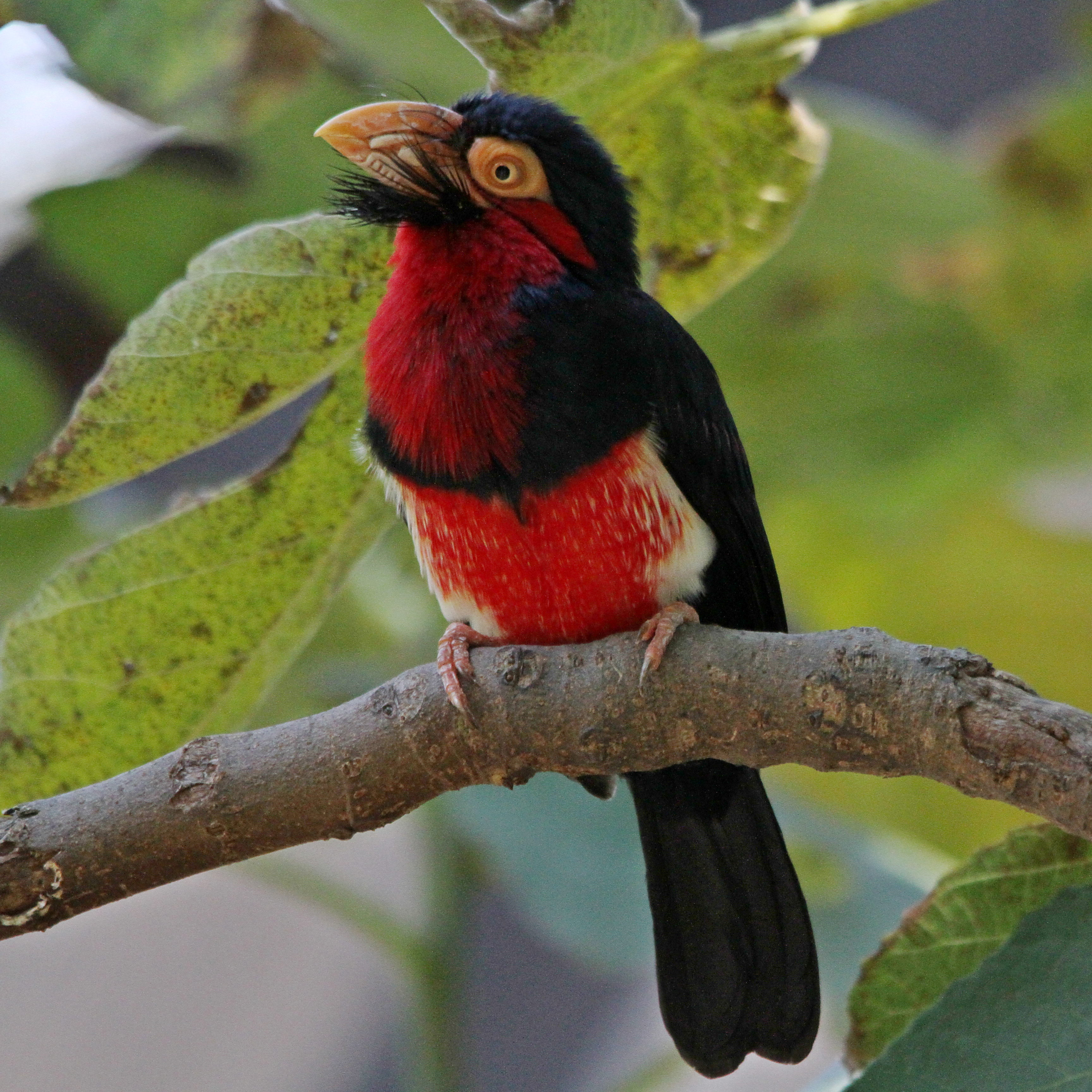
- Bearded barbet (P. dubius)

Scientific classification
- Kingdom: Animalia
- Phylum: Chordata
- Class: Aves
- Order: Piciformes
- Family: Lybiidae
- Genus: Pogonornis; Billberg, 1828

Type species
- Pogonornis dubius (Gmelin, JF, 1788)

Species
- 5, see text

= Pogonornis =

Genus of birds

Pogonornis is a genus of African barbets from the family Lybiidae (formerly included in the Capitonidae and sometimes in the Ramphastidae). This genus ranges across sub-Saharan Africa.

== Taxonomy ==
The genus Pogonornis was introduced in 1828 by the Swedish naturalist Gustaf Johan Billberg as a replacement of Pogonias Illiger, 1811, which was already occupied by the fish genus Pogonias Lacépède, 1801. The genus name is from Ancient Greek πωγων/pōgōn meaning beard, and ορνις/ornis meaning bird.

The genus Pogonornis belongs to the order Piciformes, which contains 9 families, including the woodpecker family. A couple of decades ago, all barbets were thought to be of one family, but studies of mitochondrial DNA and DNA hybridization in the early 1990s have led to barbets being split into three families: Asian barbets (Megalaimidae), African barbets (Lybiidae), and American barbets (Capitonidae). The family Lybiidae has a total of 43 species that occur throughout the continent of Africa from the tip of the Cape Peninsula to the fringes of the Sahara desert. Out of the 43 species in this family, Pogonornis contains 5 barbet species. It was previously included in another genus Lybius, which contains only 7 species currently. The 12 species from the two genera are the most frequently encountered group of African barbets.

=== Extant species ===
The genus contains 5 species:

Genus Pogonornis – Billberg, 1828 – five species
Common name	Scientific name and subspecies	Range	Size and ecology	IUCN status and estimated population
Brown-breasted barbet	Pogonornis melanopterus (Peters, 1854)	Kenya, Malawi, Mozambique, Somalia, and Tanzania.	Size: Habitat: Diet:	LC
Black-backed barbet	Pogonornis minor (Cuvier, 1816) Two subspecies: P. m. minor - (Cuvier, 1816); P. m. macclounii - (Shelley, 1899)	Gabon, Angola, Republic of the Congo and Democratic Republic of the Congo.	Size: Habitat: Diet:	LC
Double-toothed barbet	Pogonornis bidentatus (Shaw, 1799) Two subspecies: L. b. bidentatus; L. b. aequatorialis	Angola, Benin, Burundi, Cameroon, Central African Republic, Republic of the Congo, Democratic Republic of the Congo, Ivory Coast, Equatorial Guinea, Ethiopia, Gabon, Ghana, Guinea, Guinea-Bissau, Kenya, Liberia, Mali, Nigeria, Rwanda, Sierra Leone, South Sudan, Tanzania, Togo, and Uganda.	Size: Habitat: Diet:	LC
Bearded barbet	Pogonornis dubius (Gmelin, JF, 1788)	tropical west Africa	Size: Habitat: Diet:	LC
Black-breasted barbet	Pogonornis rolleti (De Filippi, 1853)	Central African Republic, Chad, Sudan, and Uganda.	Size: Habitat: Diet:	LC
