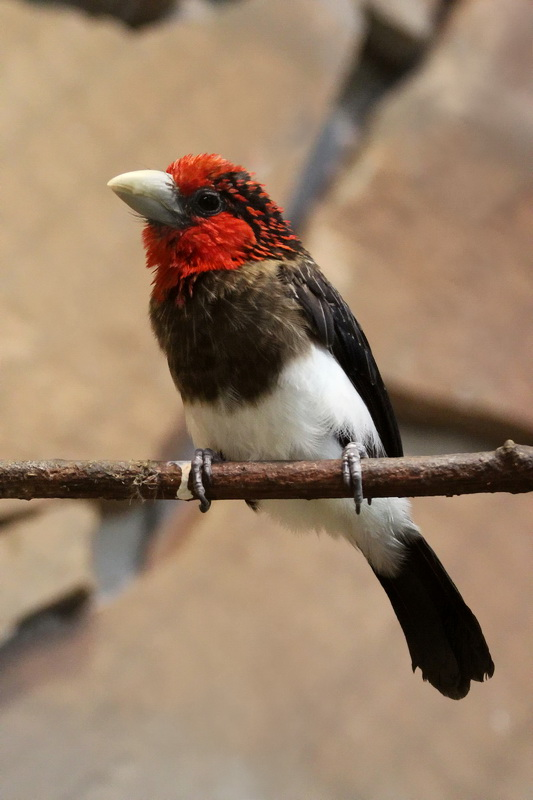

Conservation status
- Least Concern (IUCN 3.1)

Scientific classification
- Kingdom: Animalia
- Phylum: Chordata
- Class: Aves
- Order: Piciformes
- Family: Lybiidae
- Genus: Pogonornis
- Species: P. melanopterus

Binomial name
- Pogonornis melanopterus (Peters, 1854)

Synonyms
- Lybius melanopterus

= Brown-breasted barbet =

Species of bird

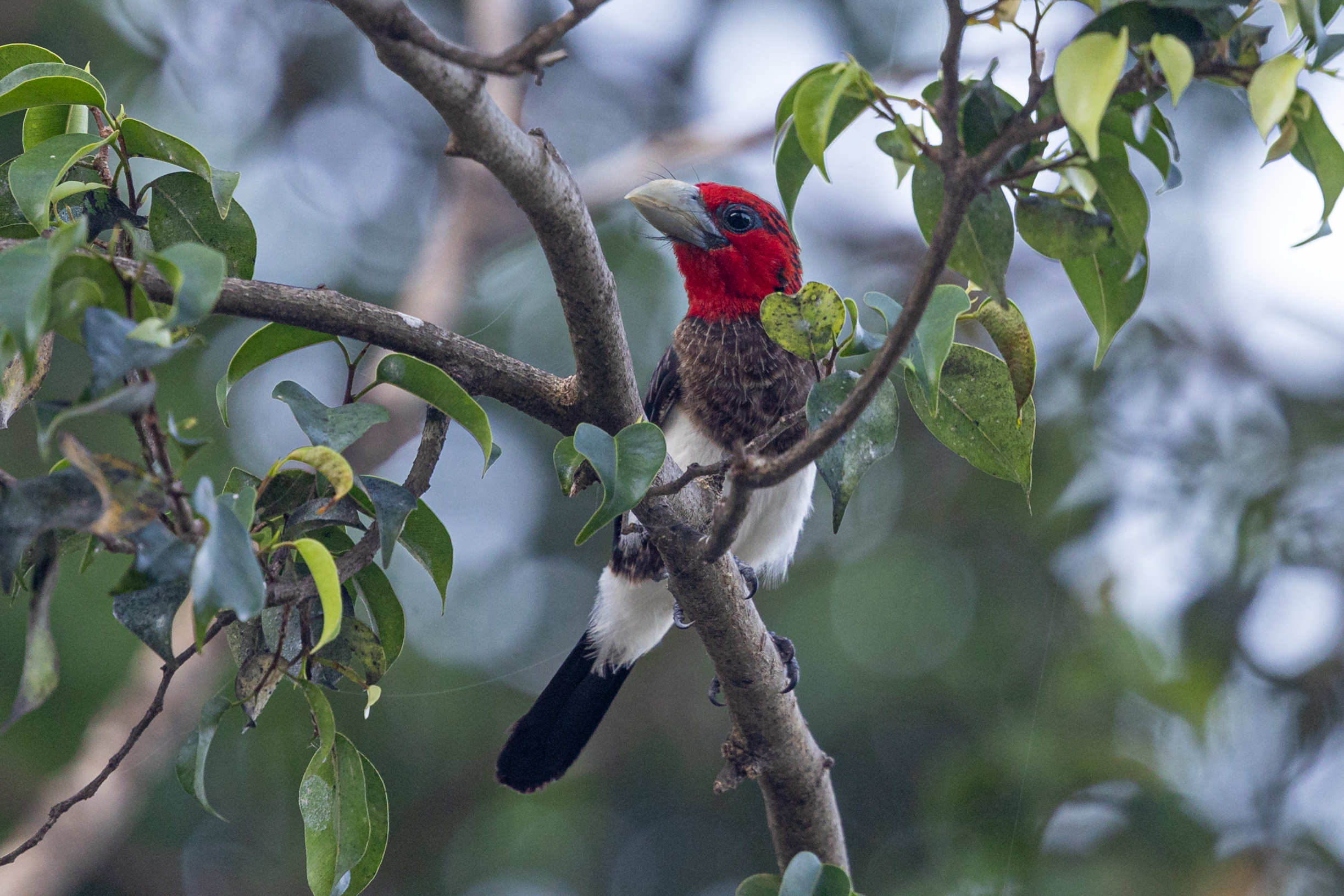
Dar es Salaam. Tanzania)

The brown-breasted barbet (Pogonornis melanopterus) is a species of bird in the family Lybiidae. It is found in Kenya, Malawi, Mozambique, Somalia, and Tanzania.
