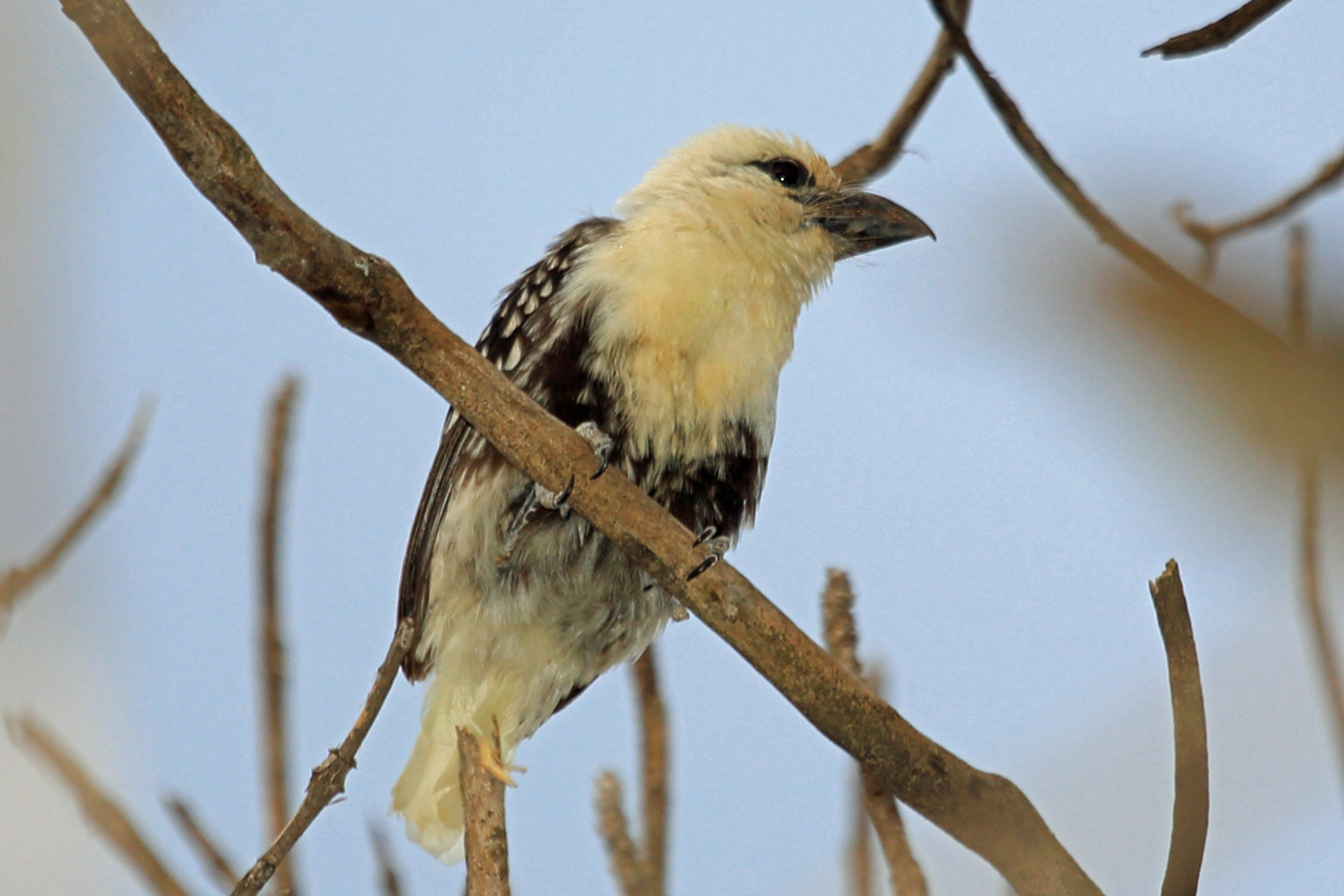

Conservation status
- Least Concern (IUCN 3.1)

Scientific classification
- Kingdom: Animalia
- Phylum: Chordata
- Class: Aves
- Order: Piciformes
- Family: Lybiidae
- Genus: Lybius
- Species: L. leucocephalus

Binomial name
- Lybius leucocephalus (De Filippi, 1853)

= White-headed barbet =

Species of bird

The white-headed barbet (Lybius leucocephalus) is a species of bird in the family Lybiidae. It is found in Angola, Cameroon, Central African Republic, Chad, Democratic Republic of the Congo, Kenya, Nigeria, South Sudan, Tanzania, and Uganda.

== Bird calls ==
This species of African barbet comprises several races distinguished by different duetting song patters but all have a raucous greeting ceremony. It is the only barbet species to use simultaneous singing during a duet.

== Description ==
This species is one of the largest in this genus at 18–19.5 cm (7.1–7.7 in) in length. It is a black and white type of barbet that has a stubby neck and a heavy-toothed bill. It is found in open woodland areas that are close to water and cultivation. It utilizes fig and jacaranda trees to find food and to excavate nests. These birds are also very social and live in small groups.

== Subspecies ==
Lybius leucocephalus includes the following subspecies:

- L. l. adamauae - Reichenow, 1921
- L. l. leucocephalus - (de Filippi, 1853)
- L. l. senex - (Reichenow, 1887)
- L. l. albicauda - (Shelley, 1881)
- L. l. lynesi - Grant, CHB & Mackworth-Praed, 1938
- L. l. leucogaster - (Barboza du Bocage, 1877)
