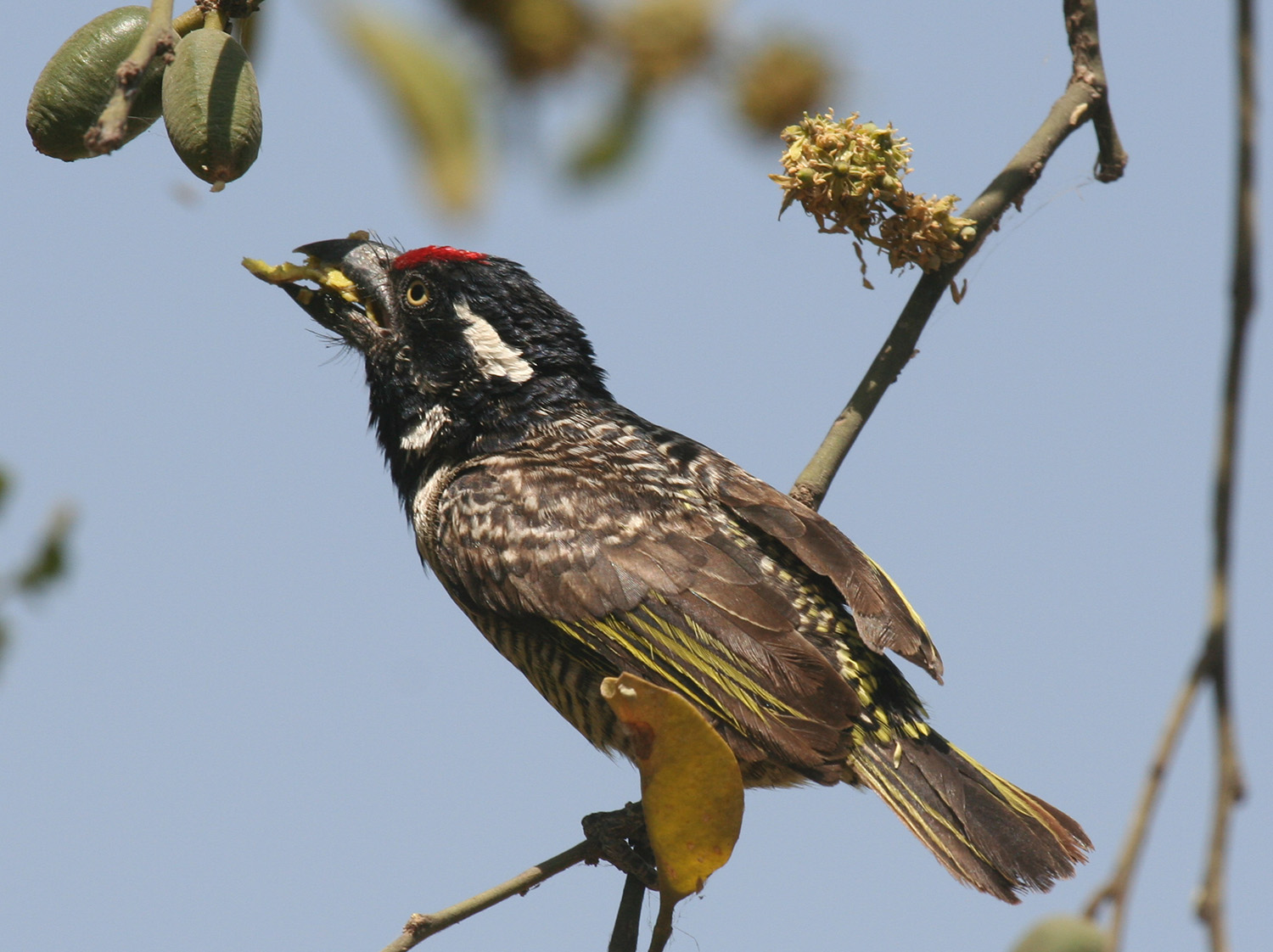

Conservation status
- Least Concern (IUCN 3.1)

Scientific classification
- Kingdom: Animalia
- Phylum: Chordata
- Class: Aves
- Order: Piciformes
- Family: Lybiidae
- Genus: Lybius
- Species: L. undatus

Binomial name
- Lybius undatus (Rüppell, 1837)

Subspecies
- L. u. thiogaster - Neumann, 1903; L. u. undatus - (Rüppell, 1837); L. u. leucogenys - (Blundell & Lovat, 1899); L. u. salvadorii - Neumann, 1903

= Banded barbet =

Species of bird

The banded barbet (Lybius undatus) is a species of bird in the family Lybiidae. It is found in Eritrea and Ethiopia.

The little-known banded barbet is very widely distributed throughout Ethiopia between 300 and 2400 metres (1000–8000 feet). Although the numbers and abundance of this species have not been determined, it seems to vary from being uncommon in the north-west and cast to locally common elsewhere in the country, living singly or in pairs in trees near water.

== Taxonomy ==
The banded barbet is somewhat of a mystery bird that has been placed in the genus Lybius for the time being. It could represent an evolutionary link between the sister genera Tricholaema and Lybius.

== Description ==
This barbet is approximately 20–25 cm long, stocky-looking, with a large head and a heavy bill with the bristles that the Lybius species is known for. It has been reported to eat insects (beetles) and the fruit of fig trees. The barbet has been described also to hawk insects like a flycatcher and to hang from a branch upside down like a tit. Its call notes are metallic and it produces also a "gr-gr-grgrgr..." in rising tempo. The barbet has been reported to nest in a hole in a branch of a tree or in a tree or in a stump. This barbet lays approximately two to four eggs when reproducing and those eggs incubate for 13–15 days. Both the parents share the parental nesting responsibilities.
