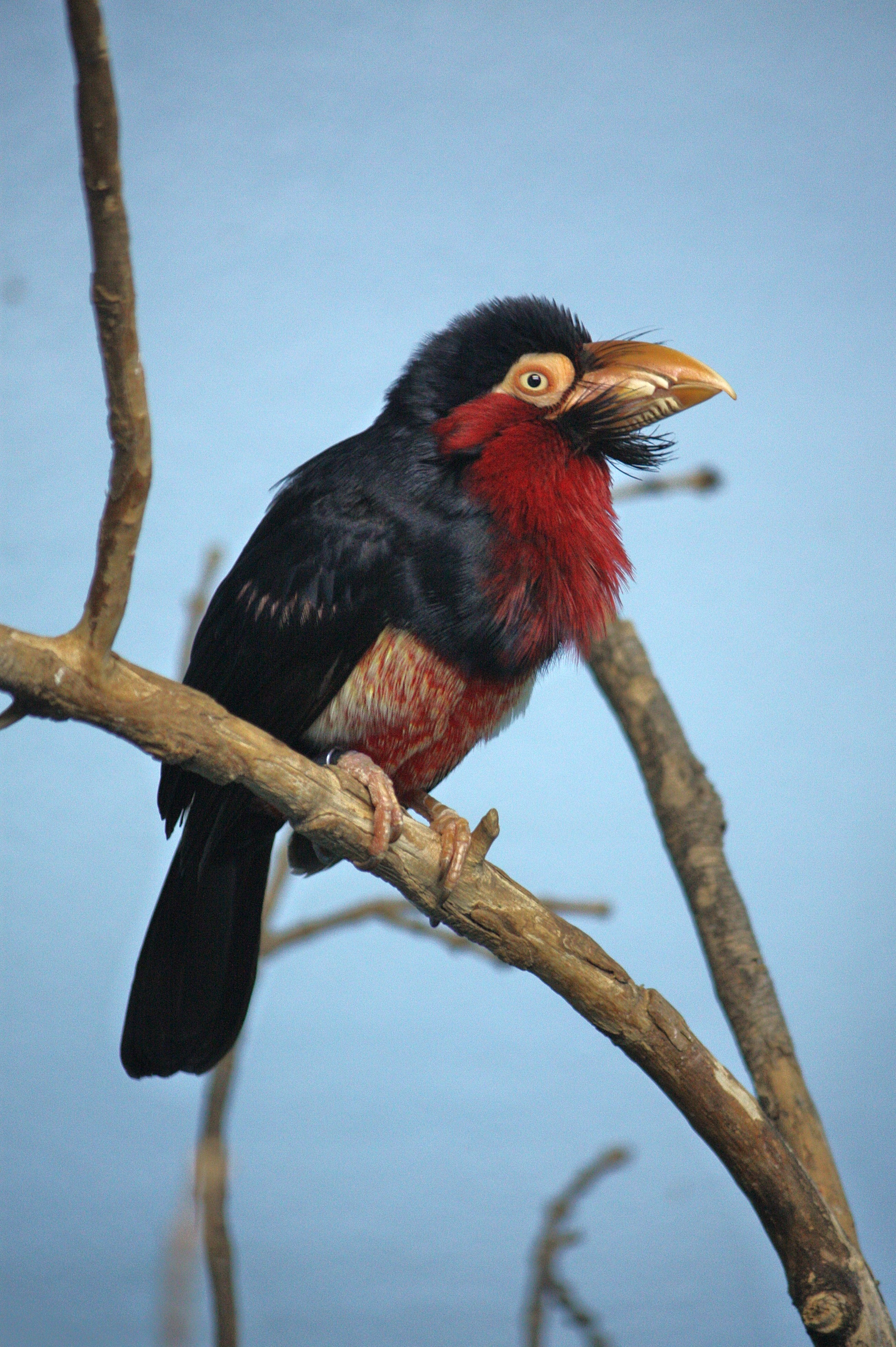
- Bearded barbet at Denver Zoo, Colorado

Conservation status
- Least Concern (IUCN 3.1)

Scientific classification
- Kingdom: Animalia
- Phylum: Chordata
- Class: Aves
- Order: Piciformes
- Family: Lybiidae
- Genus: Pogonornis
- Species: P. dubius

Binomial name
- Pogonornis dubius (Gmelin, JF, 1788)

Synonyms
- Lybius dubius

= Bearded barbet =

Species of bird

The bearded barbet (Pogonornis dubius) is an African barbet. Barbets are birds with a worldwide tropical distribution, although New World and Old World barbets are placed in different families. The barbets get their name from the bristles which fringe their heavy bills.

== Taxonomy ==
The bearded barbet was formally described in 1788 by the German naturalist Johann Friedrich Gmelin in his revised and expanded edition of Carl Linnaeus's Systema Naturae. He placed it with the puffbirds in the genus Bucco and coined the binomial name Bucco dubius. The specific epithet is Latin meaning "doubtful" or "dubious". John Latham had earlier included the species in his work A General Synopsis of Birds and had written "This bird inhabits the Coast of Barbary, and if of doubtful genus". Both Gmelin and Latham based their description on "Le Barbican" that had been described and illustrated in 1780 by the French polymath Comte de Buffon. The bearded barbet is now placed with 12 other barbets in the genus Lybius that was introduced in 1783 by the French naturalist Johann Hermann. The species is monotypic: no subspecies are recognised.

== Description ==
This is a conspicuous, large barbet at 26 centimetres (10 in) in overall length. It is fairly plump, with a short neck, large head and a shortish tail. The adult has a black crown, back, tail and breast band. The throat and belly are red and there is a yellow eye patch. The rump is white. The massive bill is very thick and yellow, and the well developed clump of bristles at its base give the species its name. Sexes are similar. The call is a growling scrawk.

== Distribution and habitat ==
The bearded barbet is a common resident breeder in tropical west Africa. It is an arboreal species of gardens and wooded country which eats fruit, although the young are fed on insects. It is found in well-wooded areas with plentiful fig trees. It will enter gardens for fruit.

== Behaviour ==
The bearded barbet forms social groups of 4-5 birds and pairs or groups roost together in a tree cavity. It nests in a tree hole, laying 2 white eggs.

== Gallery ==
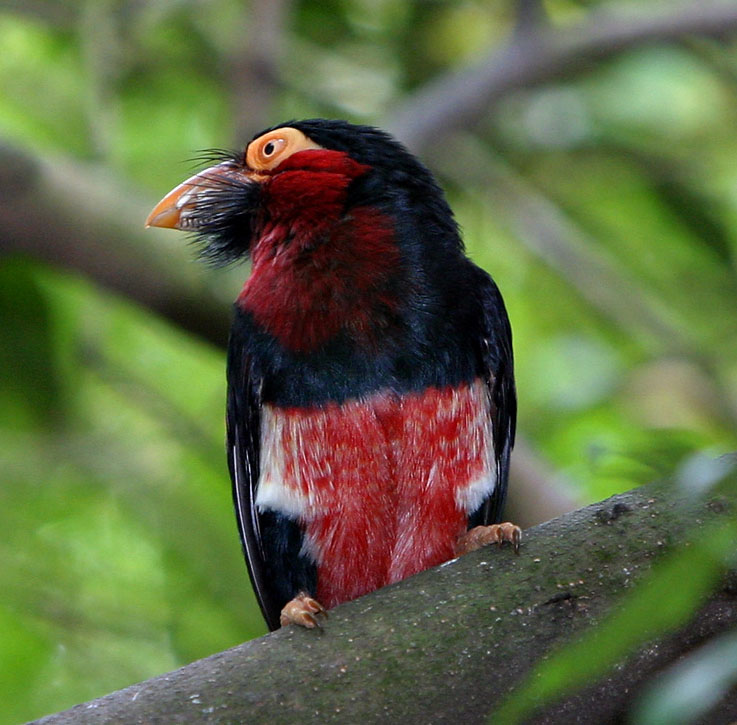

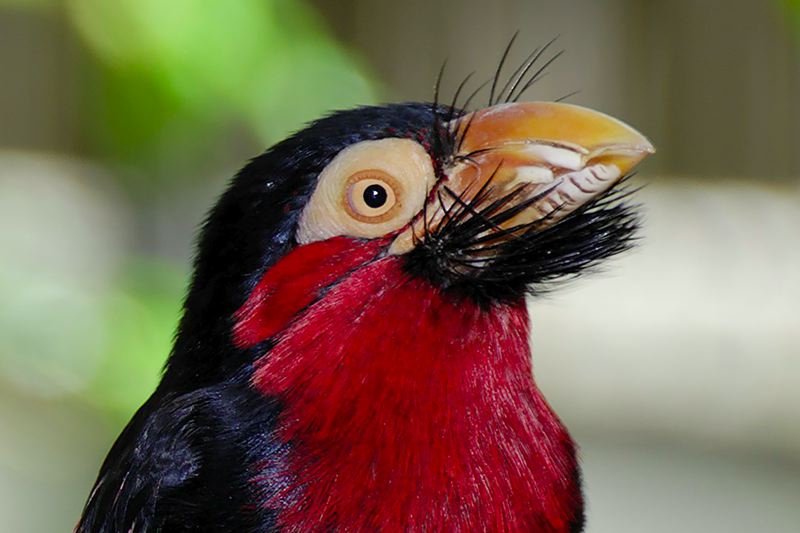
Head and "beard"

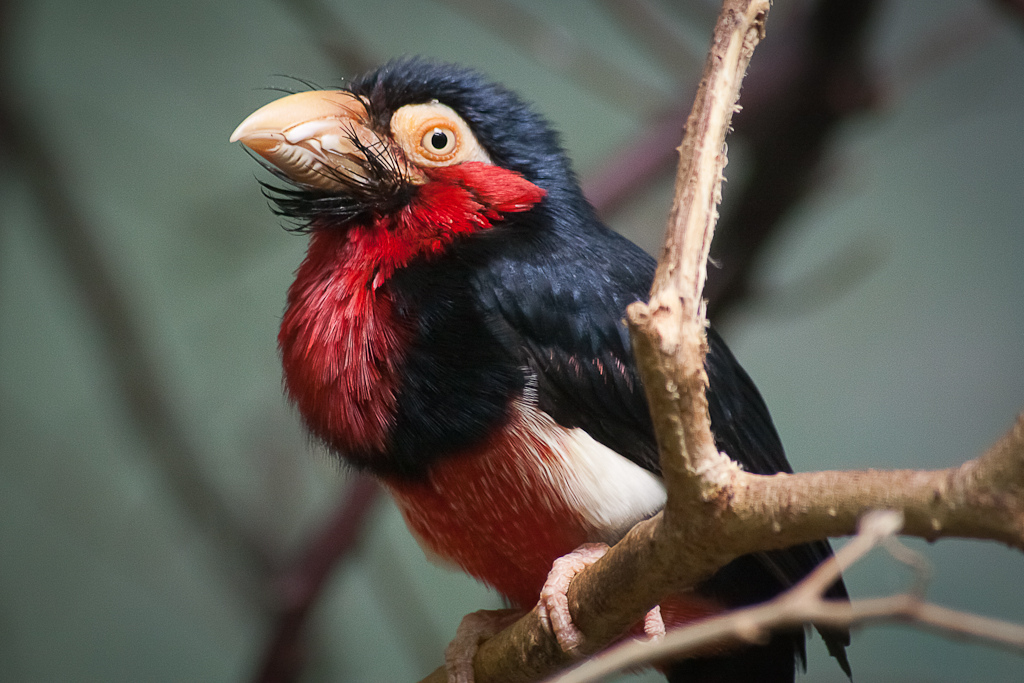
At Warsaw Zoo, Poland
