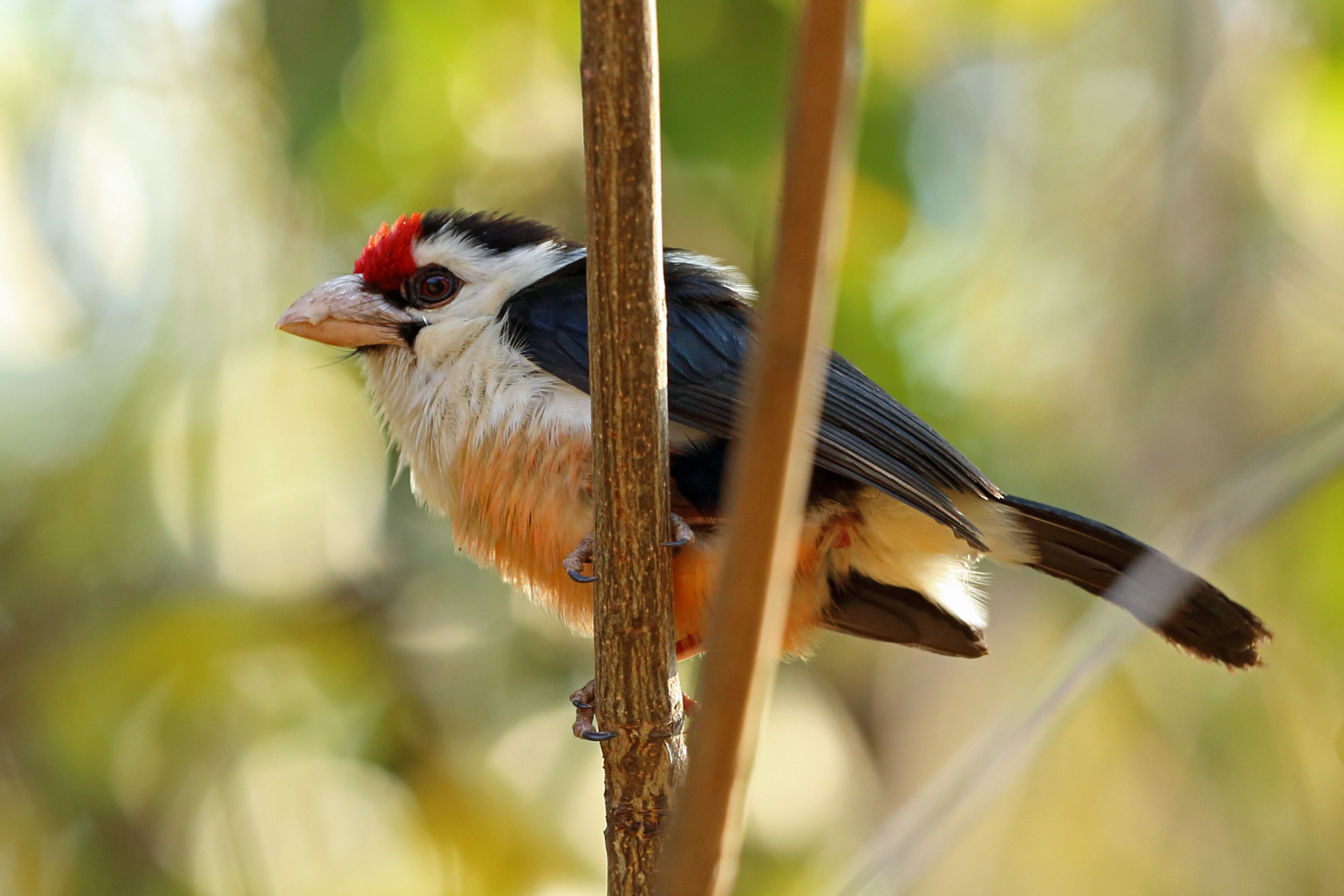

Conservation status
- Least Concern (IUCN 3.1)

Scientific classification
- Kingdom: Animalia
- Phylum: Chordata
- Class: Aves
- Order: Piciformes
- Family: Lybiidae
- Genus: Pogonornis
- Species: P. minor

Binomial name
- Pogonornis minor (Cuvier, 1816)

Subspecies
- P. m. minor - (Cuvier, 1816); P. m. macclounii - (Shelley, 1899)

Synonyms
- Lybius macclounii Pogonornis macclounii Lybius minor

= Black-backed barbet =

Species of bird

The white-faced barbet or black-backed barbet (Pogonornis minor) is a species of bird in the Lybiidae family. It is found in Gabon, Angola, Zambia, Republic of the Congo and Democratic Republic of the Congo. The habitat it is normally found in is riverine woodland and forest edges.

The common name 'white-faced barbet' recently applied to the species Pogonornis macclounii, which has since been relegated to a subspecies of Pogonornis minor.
