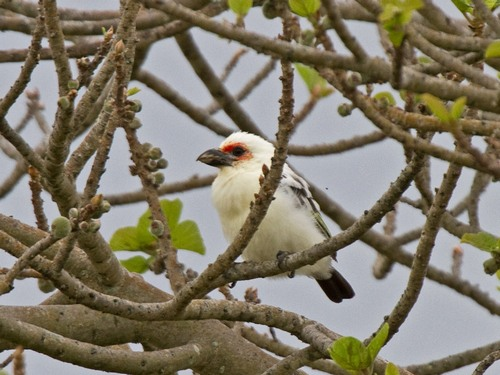

Conservation status
- Vulnerable (IUCN 3.1)

Scientific classification
- Kingdom: Animalia
- Phylum: Chordata
- Class: Aves
- Order: Piciformes
- Family: Lybiidae
- Genus: Lybius
- Species: L. chaplini

Binomial name
- Lybius chaplini Clarke, 1920

= Chaplin's barbet =

Species of bird

Chaplin's barbet (Lybius chaplini) or the Zambian barbet, is a bird species in the family Lybiidae, which was until recently united with the other barbets in the Capitonidae. This bird was named in honor of Sir Francis Drummond Percy Chaplin, a former colonial governor. The species was renamed to emphasize its status as Zambia's only true endemic bird species. It is endemic to South Central Zambia and is restricted to the area between the Upper Kafue River to Kabanga in the Kalomo District. Its natural habitats are moist savanna and arable land. It is threatened by habitat loss. It was formerly classified as a Near Threatened species by the IUCN. But new research has shown it to be rarer than it was believed. Consequently, it is uplisted to Vulnerable status in 2008.

== Description ==
Chaplin's barbet is a small bird species, measuring up to 19 cm (7.5 in) in length with a weight of 64–75 g (2.3–2.6 oz). It is a plump-looking barbet with a large head and a heavy bill with bristles. Its plumage is white with red around the eyes. Its tail is black and the wings are black with yellow on the edges. These birds are usually found in open woodland areas where figs are abundant, which is where this species prefers to gather food and nest.

== Bird calls ==
Chaplin's barbets usually occur in groups of two to six individuals and guard their territories aggressively. When calling to each other, these barbets snap their bills loudly and emit a chorus of buzzy, grating notes like an accelerating noisy cackle.

== Nesting ==
This particular barbet's breeding season is from August to November. They nest in cavities in branches of the fig trees and lay between two and four eggs that they incubate for 13–15 days. The parents share the nesting and parental care responsibilities. These barbets can be parasitized by lesser honeyguides, which lay eggs in the barbets' nests and leave them for the barbets to raise as their own. Sometimes the honeyguides will destroy some of the barbet chicks and replace them with the parasite offspring.
