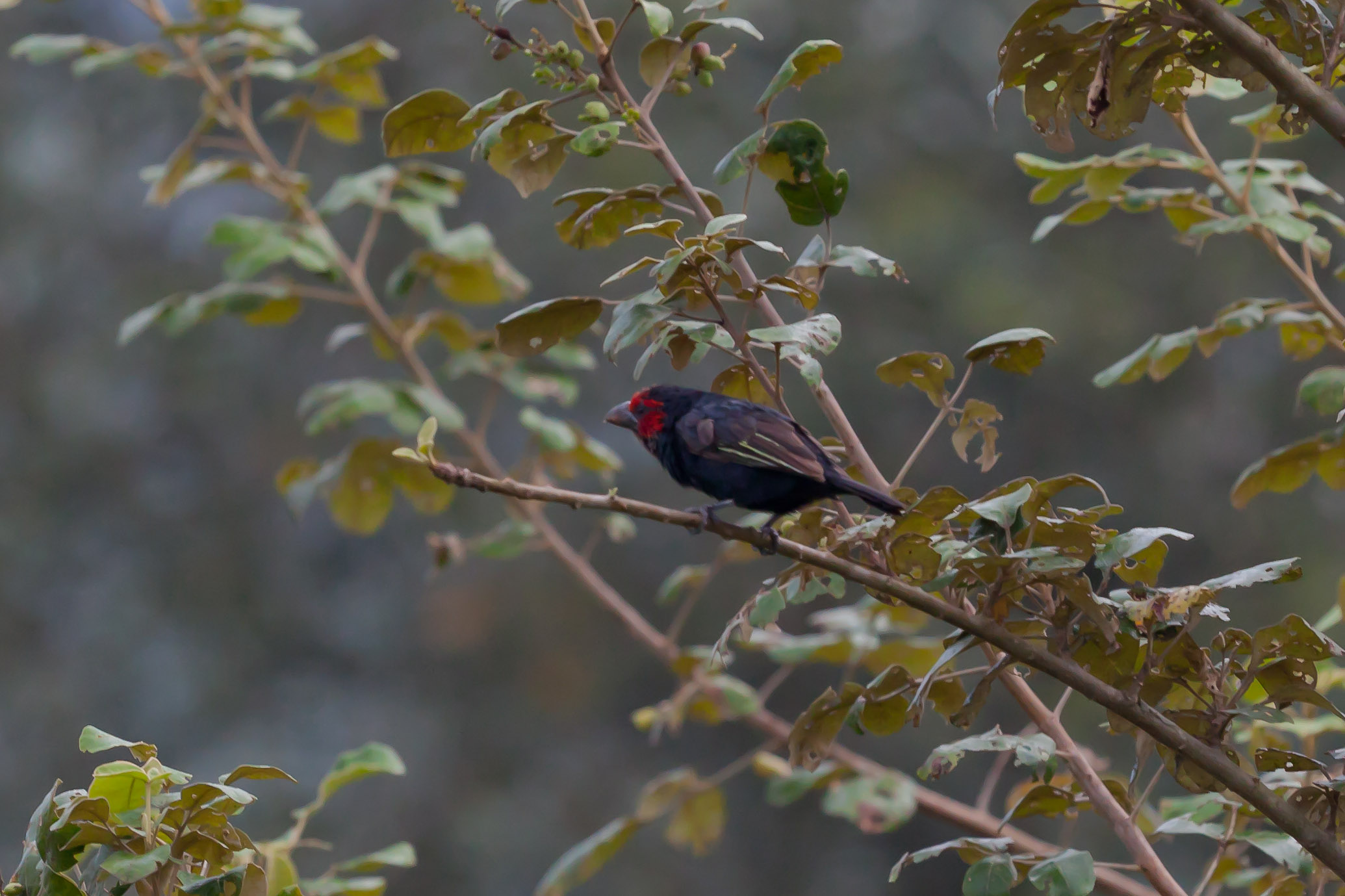

Conservation status
- Near Threatened (IUCN 3.1)

Scientific classification
- Kingdom: Animalia
- Phylum: Chordata
- Class: Aves
- Order: Piciformes
- Family: Lybiidae
- Genus: Lybius
- Species: L. rubrifacies

Binomial name
- Lybius rubrifacies (Reichenow, 1892)

= Red-faced barbet =

Species of bird

The red-faced barbet (Lybius rubrifacies) is a species of bird in the African barbet family Lybiidae. It is found in Burundi, Rwanda, Northwest Tanzania, and Southwest Uganda. Its natural habitats are dry savanna, moist savanna, and arable land. It is threatened by habitat loss.

== Description ==
This barbet is one of the smaller of the Lybius species at only 17 cm (6.7 in) in length. It has red coloring on the side of the face and around the eye, but is black on the dorsal side of the head. Its entire body is black and its wings are streaked with yellow. This type of barbet is sexually monomorphic, meaning that both the males and females are generally similar in morphology, size and behavior.

== Vocalizations ==
This species sings duets in order to communicate with mates and other individuals. Among its genus, the red-faced barbet is the only member to begin its duetting with a bill-snapping behavior. While individuals outside of a duetting pair will participate in "greeting ceremonies," duetting songs are generally exclusive to the primary pair communicating. These duetting songs are crucial for the establishment and defense of a territory, as well as in finding suitable mates.
