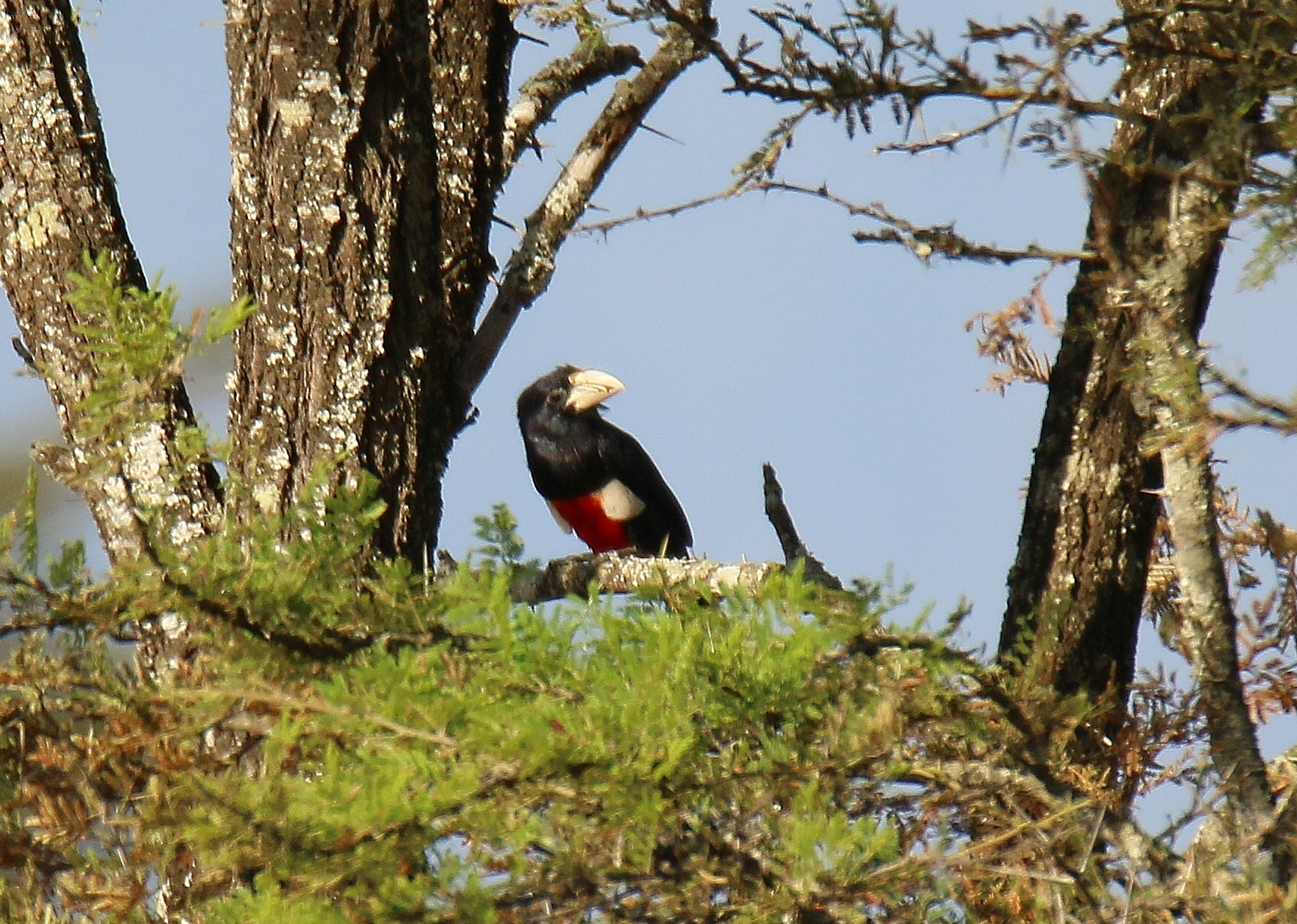

Conservation status
- Least Concern (IUCN 3.1)

Scientific classification
- Kingdom: Animalia
- Phylum: Chordata
- Class: Aves
- Order: Piciformes
- Family: Lybiidae
- Genus: Pogonornis
- Species: P. rolleti

Binomial name
- Pogonornis rolleti (De Filippi, 1853)

Synonyms
- Lybius rolleti

= Black-breasted barbet =

Species of bird

The black-breasted barbet (Pogonornis rolleti) is a species of bird in the Lybiidae family. It is found in Central African Republic, Chad, Sudan, South Sudan, and the extreme northeast of Democratic Republic of Congo and northern Uganda.

It occurs in woodlands of the eastern Sahel, between 200m and 1200m altitude (and as high as 2134m in western Sudan).

== Taxonomy ==
This species is monotypic.

== Distribution and habitat ==
The black-breasted barbet's range is largely in South Sudan. It is however known from Zakouma National Park, where birders do go to search for it.

== Behaviour and ecology ==
This frugivorous barbet is known to frequent fig trees in Zakouma National Park in the dry season. As these riverine areas flood heavily in the wet season, their movements are unknown but they are not presumed to be migratory.
