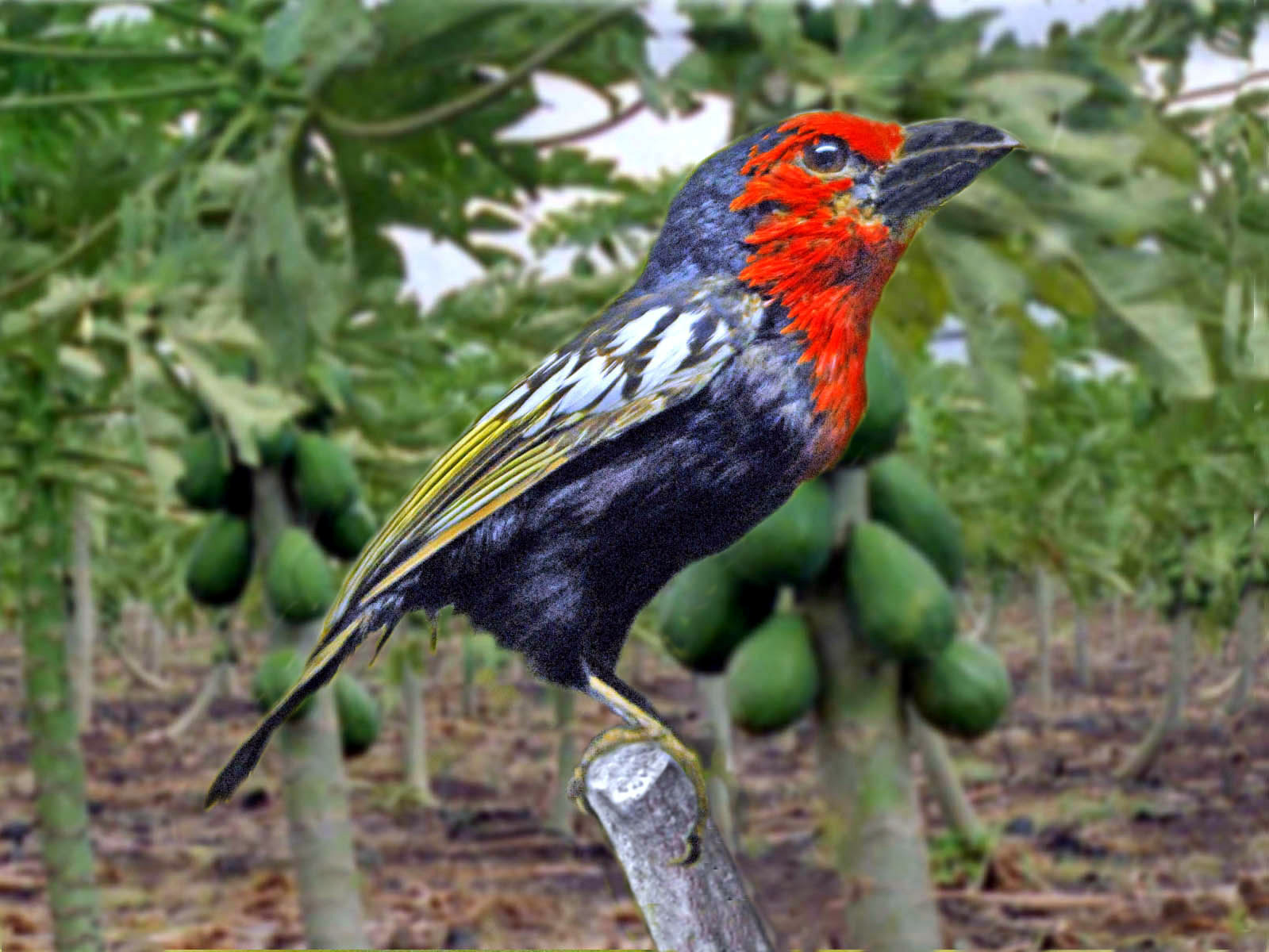
- black-billed barbet (L. guifsobalito)

Scientific classification
- Kingdom: Animalia
- Phylum: Chordata
- Class: Aves
- Order: Piciformes
- Family: Lybiidae
- Genus: Lybius; Hermann, 1783

Type species
- Lybius guifsobalito Hermann, 1783

Species
- 12, see text

= Lybius =

Genus of birds

Lybius is a genus of African barbets from the family Lybiidae (formerly included in the Capitonidae and sometimes in the Ramphastidae). This genus ranges across sub-Saharan Africa.

== Description ==
The Lybius species are usually about 20–25 cm (7.9–9.8 in) long, plump-looking, with large heads, and their heavy bill is fringed with bristles. Almost all species in this genus are characterized by their red feathers on the head or around the eyes, but there is a great variety of morphology in this genus. There are barbets like the white-headed barbet that have no red on the head at all, and species like the double-toothed barbet with all red feathers on the ventral side of the body and head, but with only black on the dorsal side. Pretty much all species in this genus have striking plumage, consisting of red, black, yellow or white colors. These are also mainly solitary birds that eat fruit, insects and small vertebrates like lizards.

== Taxonomy ==
The genus Lybius was introduced in 1783 by the French naturalist Johann Hermann to accommodate a single species, the black-billed barbet, which is therefore the type species. The genus name is from Ancient Greek libuos, an unidentified bird mentioned by Aristotle.

The genus Lybius belongs to the order Piciformes, which contains 9 families, including the woodpecker family. A couple of decades ago, all barbets were thought to be of one family, but studies of mitochondrial DNA and DNA hybridization in the early 1990s have led to barbets being split into three families: Asian barbets (Megalaimidae), African barbets (Lybiidae), and American barbets (Capitonidae). The family Lybiidae has a total of 43 species that occur throughout the continent of Africa from the tip of the Cape Peninsula to the fringes of the Sahara desert. Out of the 43 species in this family, Lybius contains 7 barbet species. The genus Pogonornis, containing 5 barbet species, was previously included in the genus Lybius. These are the most frequently encountered group of African barbets.

=== Extant species ===
The genus contains 7 species:

Image	Common name	Scientific name	Distribution
	Banded barbet	Lybius undatus	Eritrea and Ethiopia.
	Vieillot's barbet	Lybius vieilloti	Senegal to Ethiopia
	White-headed barbet	Lybius leucocephalus	Angola, Cameroon, Central African Republic, Chad, Democratic Republic of the Congo, Kenya, Nigeria, South Sudan, Tanzania, and Uganda.
	Chaplin's barbet or Zambian barbet	Lybius chaplini	South Central Zambia
	Red-faced barbet	Lybius rubrifacies	Burundi, Rwanda, Northwest Tanzania, and Southwest Uganda
	Black-billed barbet	Lybius guifsobalito	Cameroon, Democratic Republic of the Congo, Eritrea, Ethiopia, Kenya, Sudan, Tanzania, and Uganda.
	Black-collared barbet	Lybius torquatus	Sub-Saharan Africa through Angola, Botswana, Burundi, Democratic Republic of the Congo, Eswatini, Kenya, Lesotho, Malawi, Mozambique, Namibia, Rwanda, South Africa, Tanzania, Uganda, Zambia, and Zimbabwe.

== Bird calls ==
Most of the Lybius species use duetting as a way to mark one's territory and to find a mate. Mates must have coordinating duets in order to be a proper match for each other, which means lone singers are very uncommon in the duetting barbet species. Duet songs are species-specific, and only paired duetting barbets can hold a territory, which is why lone singers are rarely seen. There are four known duetting species in this genus: Lybius vieilloti, L. leucocephalus, L. rubrifacies, and L. torquatus. The duetting of L. chaplini and L. undatus is unknown. The behavioral significance of duetting probably involves sex recognition and the maintenance of a pair bond.

Generally, the barbets in the duet will bow ceremoniously to each other while singing. In addition to bowing, certain African barbet species, like Lybius vieilloti and Lybius torquatus, will incorporate a snarl into their duet. The snarl might actually be how the duets are initiated in this species. When duetting, each bird will pick up the song from where the other bird left off. The time interval between when one bird ends the duet and when the other bird begins the song again is called the "auditory response time". Basically, the auditory response time is the minimum time required for the barbet to hear the notes and respond to them.
