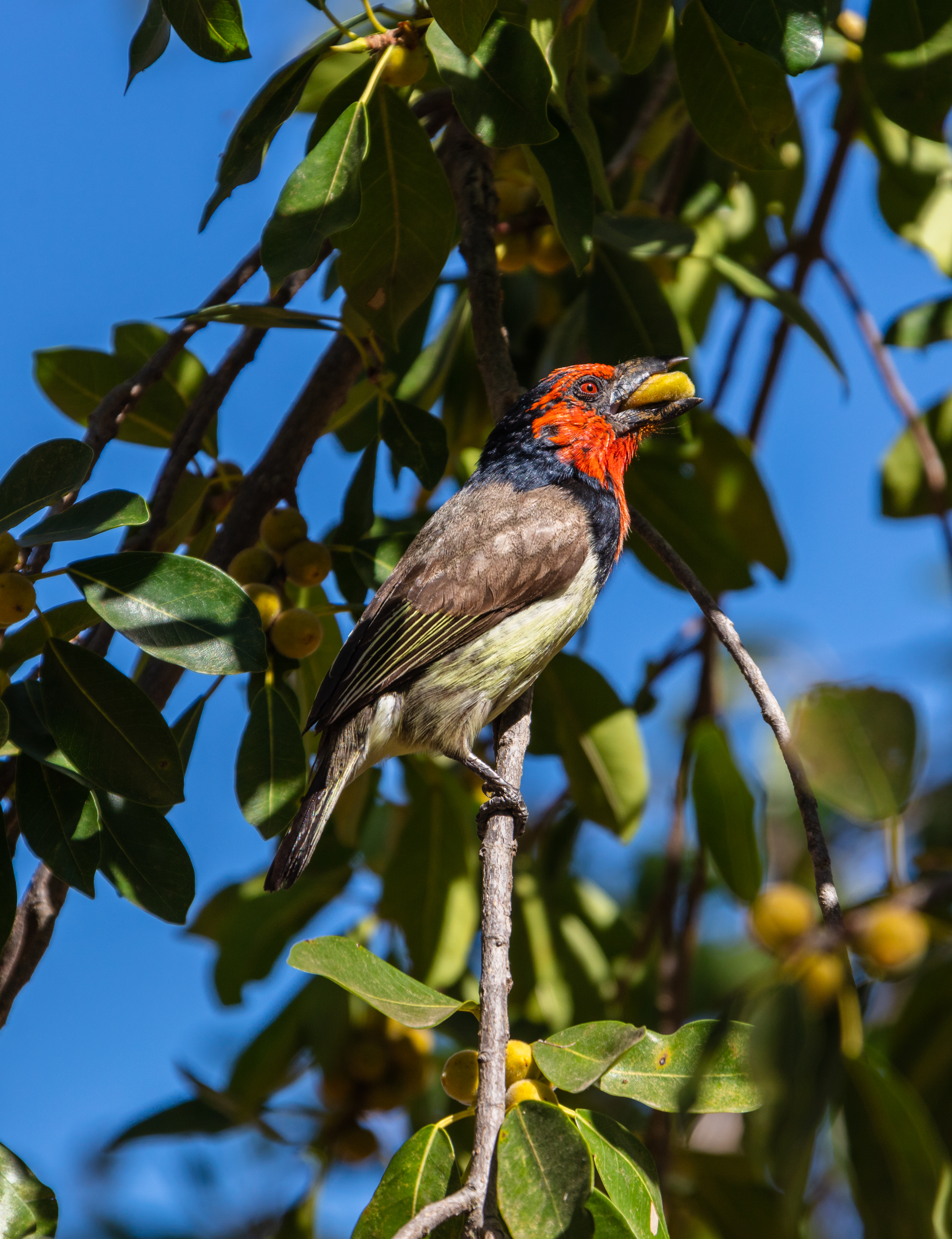

Conservation status
- Least Concern (IUCN 3.1)

Scientific classification
- Kingdom: Animalia
- Phylum: Chordata
- Class: Aves
- Order: Piciformes
- Family: Lybiidae
- Genus: Lybius
- Species: L. torquatus

Binomial name
- Lybius torquatus (Dumont, 1805)

= Black-collared barbet =

Species of bird

The black-collared barbet (Lybius torquatus) is a species of bird in the family Lybiidae which is native to sub-Saharan Africa. Indigenous names include Rooikophoutkapper in Afrikaans, isiKhulukhulu and isiQonQotho in Zulu, and Isinagogo in Xhosa.

== Range ==
It is found in Sub-Saharan Africa through Angola, Botswana, Burundi, Democratic Republic of the Congo, Eswatini, Kenya, Lesotho, Malawi, Mozambique, Namibia, Rwanda, South Africa, Tanzania, Uganda, Zambia, and Zimbabwe.

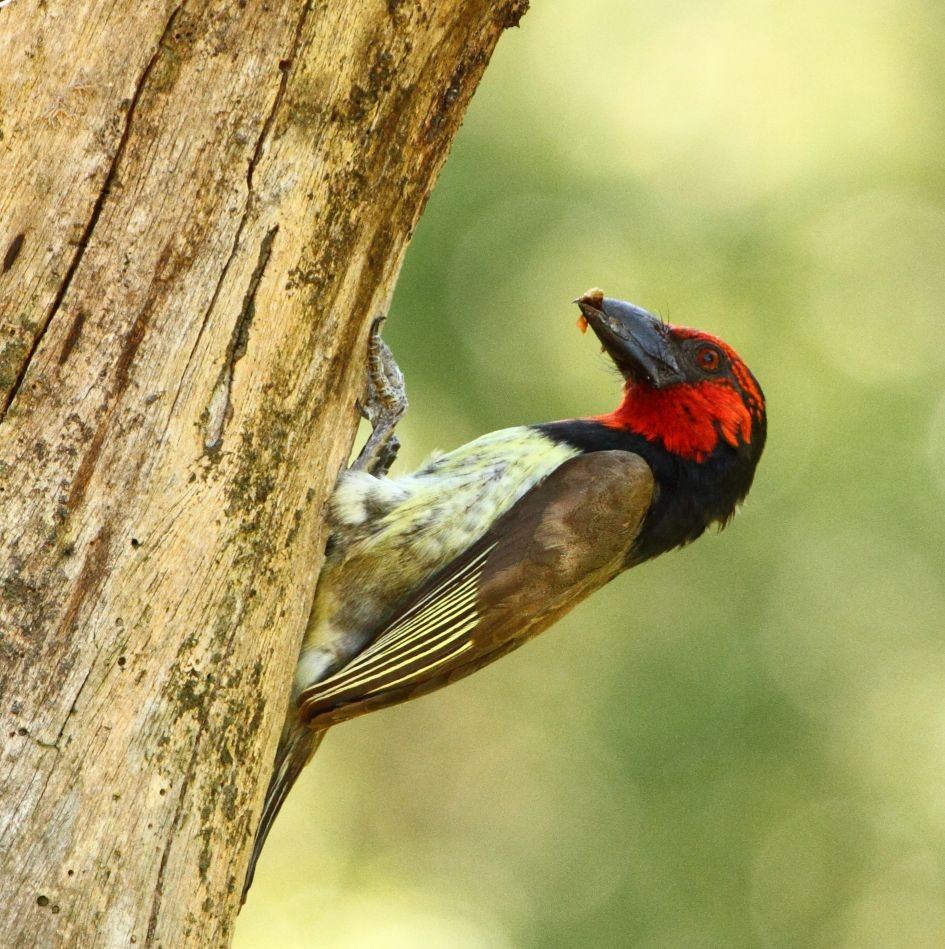
Inspecting a tree

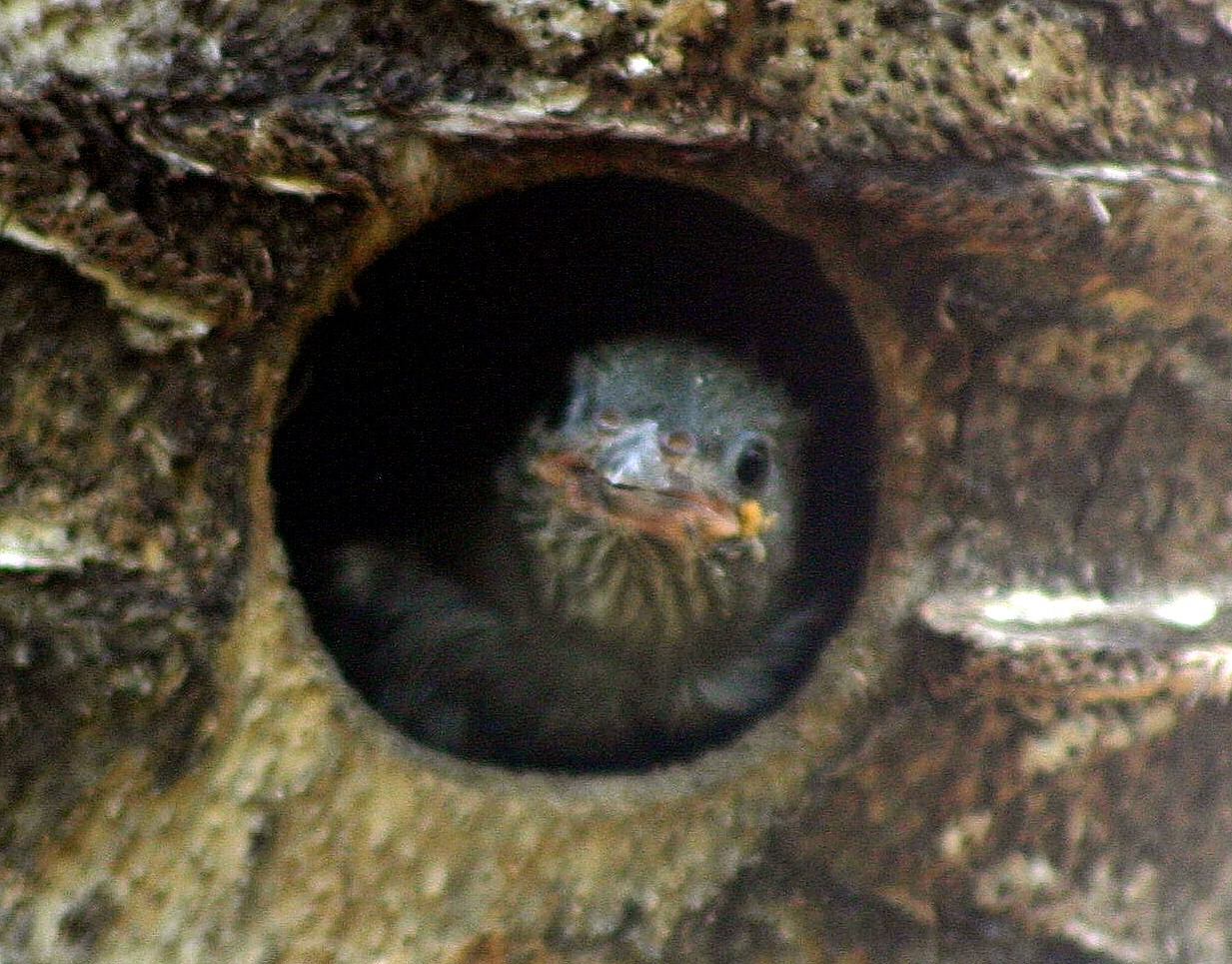
A lesser honeyguide nestling, a brood parasite of barbets, waiting to be fed

== Description ==
The black-collared barbet usually is about 20–25 cm long, plump-looking and has a large head. It also has the heavy bill fringed with bristles that is characteristic of the genus Lybius. This barbet has a very obvious black collar and head which gives reference to its name. It also has a fire-engine red coloring around the eyes and beak. It has morphologically variable coloring because there is a replacement of a red head with a black head. It also has a more intense color and is larger than other barbets. This bird is also sexually monomorphic, which means that there is generally no phenotypic difference between the males and females of this species. The morphology, size and behavior are basically the same.

== Bird calls ==
The black-collared barbet is one of the many duetting species in the genus Lybius and it regularly uses duetting in its day-to-day life. There are no solitary song instances heard from this species. Also, the repertoire of the duets do not vary greatly. This species is readily recognized by its loud duet, commonly rendered as "too-puddly too-puddly too-puddly" or "too-doodle too-doodle".... accompanied by wing-flicking. In addition to the wing-flicking, the birds in the pair face each other while calling and lean forward while bowing ceremoniously to each other. This bird produces a variety of calls including its snarling warning call and loud buzzing. The snarling could be the initiating sound of the duet.

The "too-puddly" song is actually an antiphonal duet. That means that one bird out of the pair sings the first note, then the other bird in the pair sings the second note. To bystanders, this does not sound like it comes from two different birds. It has distinct sexual duet roles after a greeting ceremony and the partner's notes do differ. The birds do not sing simultaneously, but are synchronized in their duets. The time between when one bird stops singing to when the other bird in the pair picks the song up is called the auditory response time for the duet. The approximate auditory response time for this bird is 178 ms.

This species also incorporates more wing and flight displays into their greeting ceremonies, mating, and territorial displays. It is a gregarious species, often acting in concert when driving off intruders and roosting together (up to 15 recorded) in nest holes. Their flight is direct with a loud whirring of wings.

== Diet/feeding ==
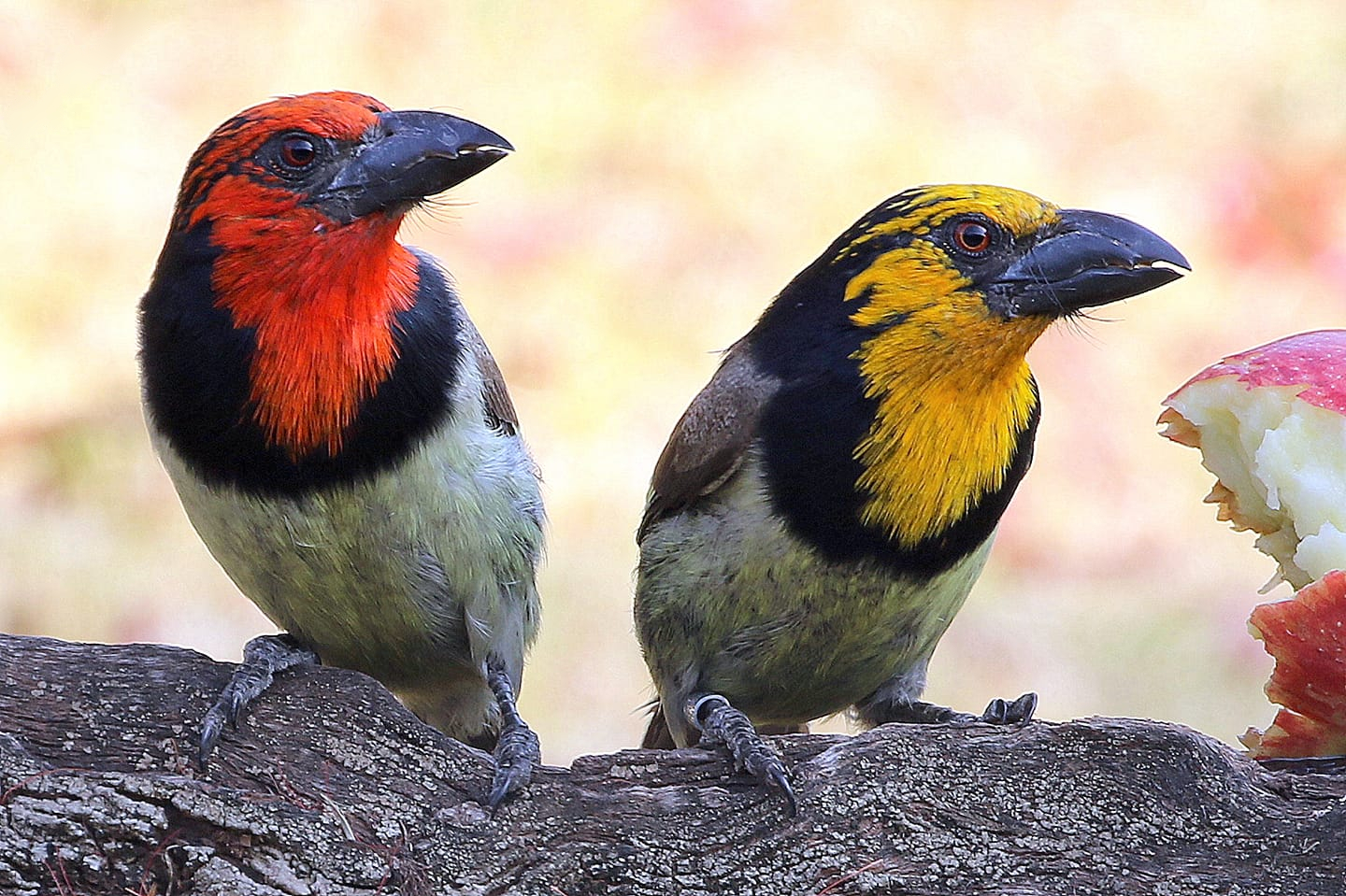
The rare yellow-headed (or xanthocroic) form perched beside a normal individual.

These barbets are mostly solitary birds that eat a variety of fruits and vegetables. They will often visit plantations and find food there. They eat fruits whole and the seed pits are regurgitated later. Black-collared barbets can also feed on insects, centipedes, lizards, frogs and geckos, though this does not occur as often.

== Breeding ==
The L. torquatus species has a breeding season from December to February.

== Subspecies ==
Lybius torquatus includes the following subspecies:

- L. t. zombae (Shelley, 1893) ―
- L. t. pumilio Grote, 1927 ―
- L. t. irroratus (Cabanis, 1878) ―
- L. t. congicus (Reichenow, 1898) ―
- L. t. vivacens Clancey, 1977 ― Malawi, Mozambique and eastern Zimbabwe
- L. t. bocagei (Sousa, 1886) ― Angola, western Zambia, northern Namibia and northern Botswana
- L. t. torquatus (Dumont, 1805) ― southernmost subsp., eastern Botswana to Eswatini and Eastern Cape
